A coup d'état, often abbreviated to coup, is the overthrow of a lawful government through illegal means. If force or violence are not involved, such an event is sometimes called a soft or bloodless coup. In another variation, a ruler who came to power through legal means may try to stay in power through illegal means, thus preventing the next legal ruler from taking power. These events  are called self coups. This is a chronological list of such coups and coup attempts, from ancient times to the present.

BCE

876, Kingdom of Israel: Zimri, a military commander of Israel, killed King Elah and became king himself. Soon after, he committed suicide to avoid being overthrown by his own commander, Omri.
860, Qi coup d'état of 860 BC in Qi: Duke Hu of Qi was overthrown by his half-brother Shan.
841, Kingdom of Israel: Jehu killed Jehoram of Israel and Ahaziah of Judah, and became king of Israel.
730, Kingdom of Judah: There was a failed coup attempt by Rezin of Aram-Damascus and Pekah of Israel to try to overthrow Ahaz of Judah and the House of David and to replace him with Ben Tav'el.
716, Lydia: King Candaules of Lydia was killed by his bodyguard, Gyges, who then assumed the throne, having conspired with Candaules's wife.
632, Athens: A coup attempt failed in Athens, by Cylon who attempted to establish himself as a tyrant.
522, Murder of the Magi in the Achaemenid Empire: Bardiya was assassinated in a conspiracy led by Otanes, leading to the accession of Darius the Great of the Achaemenid Dynasty.
509, Rome: Members of the Tarquin dynasty led by Lucius Junius Brutus overthrew King of Rome Lucius Tarquinius Superbus and established the Roman Republic.
411, Athens: A coup at Athens, led by Antiphon, established a short-lived oligarchy known as The Four Hundred.
404, Athens: A coup at Athens, led by Critias, established the short-lived pro-Spartan oligarchy known as the Thirty Tyrants.
209, Xiongnu Empire: The Xiongnu Emperor Modu Chanyu overthrew his father Touman and killed his rival half-brother.
185, Maurya Empire: There was a coup in the Maurya Empire, which controlled much of present Indian territory, by Mauryan General Pushyamitra Shunga.
88, Rome: Lucius Cornelius Sulla occupied Rome and outlawed his enemy, Gaius Marius.
82, Rome: In Sulla's civil war, Sulla again marched on Rome, removed Gaius Marius the Younger, and proclaimed himself as Roman dictator.
63, Rome: In the Catiline conspiracy, Lucius Sergius Catilina plotted to overthrow the consulship of Marcus Tullius Cicero and Gaius Antonius Hybrida, but the plan was discovered.
49, Rome: Julius Caesar, heading part of the Roman army, illegally crossed the Rubicon and marched on Rome. After assuming control of government, he was proclaimed "dictator in perpetuity".
44, Rome: On the Ides of March, Julius Caesar was assassinated by members of the Roman Senate. The conspirators did not gain control of the Roman Republic, instead, power eventually passed to the Second Triumvirate of Caesar supporters.

1–999

41, Rome: Roman Emperor Caligula was assassinated as a result of a conspiracy by officers of the Praetorian Guard, senators, and courtiers, though the conspirators' attempt to use the opportunity to restore the Roman Republic was thwarted.
65, Pisonian conspiracy in Rome: Gaius Calpurnius Piso plotted to have Roman Emperor Nero assassinated, but the plan was discovered.
69, Rome: Following Roman Emperor Nero's death, several complots lead to the year of the Four Emperors.
189, Eastern Han dynasty (China): The Ten Eunuchs of Later Han Dynasty were murdered by troops led by Yuan Shao and Yuan Shu; Dong Zhuo took over the government by force.
249, Incident at Gaoping Tombs in Cao Wei (ancient China): Cao Shuang was captured and executed by the Sima house (Sima Yi, Sima Zhao, and Sima Shi).
378, Tikal: King Chak Tok Ich'aak of Tikal was assassinated in a Teotihuacan-backed coup.
Matori was killed by Otomo no Kanamura. 
552, Rouran Khaganate: Bumin Qaghan overthrew the Rouran Khaganate and declared the Turkic Khaganate.
602, Byzantine Empire: Maurice, Emperor of the Byzantine Empire, was deposed by a conspiracy of the Balkan army, which was led by a Thracian junior officer named Flavius Phocas and Maurice's seven sons. Most of the pro-Maurice government officials and generals were executed along with him (excepting Priscus and Philippicus), and Phocas was acclaimed emperor in the church of St. John the Baptist.
610, Heraclian revolt in the Byzantine Empire: The same Phocas who had deposed Maurice eight years earlier was deposed by a conspiracy led by the generals Priscus, his son-in-law, and Heraclius the Elder, the governor of north Africa. The exarch's son, Heraclius the Younger, deposed Phocas with the help of his cousin Niketas.
626, Xuanwu Gate Incident in the Tang Empire (China): On 2 July, Prince Li Shimin and his close followers killed Crown Prince Li Jiancheng and Prince Li Yuanji before taking complete control of the Tang government from Emperor Gaozu.
642, Goguryeo: Yeon Gaesomun of Goguryeo led a military coup that killed King Yeongryu and installed King Bojang as a puppet under military rule.
680, Visigothic Kingdom: King Wamba of the Visigoths was drugged, tonsured, and dressed in a monk's cloak, so he would be considered an ordained man and hence he could not reign.
717, Second Turkic Khaganate: Inel Qaghan of Second Turkic Khaganate was dethroned and later killed by Bilge Kaghan's brother Kül Tigin.
742, Second Turkic Khaganate: Ashina Shi usurped the Second Turkic Khaganate throne after killing three of his rivals.
751, Umayyad Caliphate: Abu Muslim Khorasani stormed Damascus and massacred the ruling Banu Umayyad family. As-Saffah became the first ruler of the Abbasid Caliphate.
839, Silla: Jang Bogo of Silla overthrew King Minae and installed King Sinmu on the throne.

1000–1699

1010, Goryeo: General Gang Jo of Goryeo staged a coup that overthrew King Mokjong.
1126, Goryeo: Yi Ja-gyeom of Goryeo made a failed attempt to overthrow King Injong.
1170, Goryeo: General Jeong Jung-bu of Goryeo led a military coup that deposed King Uijong and installed puppet king Myeongjong under military regime.
1197, Goryeo: Choe Chung-heon of Goryeo staged a military coup that ousted and killed military dictator Yi Ui-Min, and deposed King Myeongjong.
1258, Goryeo: General Kim Jun of Goryeo overthrew and killed then-military dictator Choe Ui.
1284, Ilkhanate: The Ilkhanate ruler Tekuder was overthrown by Arghun.
1327, England: Isabella of France overthrew her husband, Edward II, and became regent for their son, Edward III, with her lover and co-regent, Roger Mortimer.
1330, England: Edward III assumed royal power, arrested Isabella of France and executed Roger Mortimer.
1388, Goryeo: General Yi Seong-gye of Goryeo led a military coup that deposed King U, murdered General Choe Young, and installed puppet ruler King Chang and eventually King Gongyang. Yi later crowned himself, starting the Joseon Dynasty.
1452, Aq Qoyunlu: Uzun Hasan seized Diyarbakir in a coup while sultan Jahangir was away on a military expedition.
1398, Joseon dynasty (Korea): Prince Yi Bangwon of Joseon led a coup that murdered Prime Minister Jeong Dojeon and two other princes.
1455, Joseon dynasty (Korea): Prince Suyang of Joseon led a coup that ousted the government of Prime Minister Hwangbo In and Kim Jong Seo, who were killed during the coup.
1459, Đại Việt: Prince Lê Nghi Dân led a coup that killed Emperor Lê Nhân Tông. Lê Nghi Dân later crowned himself.
1459, Đại Việt: Đỗ Bí and Lê Thụ led a coup that overthrew Emperor Lê Nghi Dân.
1506, Joseon dynasty (Korea): A coup d'état in Joseon overthrew Prince Yeonsan and placed King Jungjong on the throne.
1512, Ottoman Empire: Selim I rebelled against his father Bayezid II and took the throne of Ottoman Empire.
1541, Peru: Juan de Rada led a coup that ousted and killed Spanish conquistador and governor of Peru, Francisco Pizarro, and installed Diego de Almagro II as governor.
1567, Scotland: Protestant rebels arrested Mary Queen of Scots and forced her to sign the Abdicate on 24 July 1567 in favour of the infant James VI and to appoint her illegitimate half-brother, James Stewart, Earl of Moray, as regent.
1569, 1569 Plot in Sweden: Courtiers of the imprisoned Eric XIV attempted to free and reinstate him, deposing John III of Sweden. The plot was exposed and prevented, and the conspirators were executed.
 1574, Mornay Plot in Sweden: A plot to depose John III of Sweden and reinstate Eric XIV was discovered in Sweden.
1605, Gunpowder Plot in England: On 5 November, a group of provincial English Catholics led by Guy Fawkes attempted to kill King James I and much of the Protestant aristocracy by blowing up the Houses of Parliament during the State Opening of Parliament.
1622, Janissaries' Revolt in the Ottoman Empire: Janissaries revolted against Osman II and imprisoned him in the Seven Towers. He was murdered shortly afterwards.
1623, Joseon dynasty (Korea): A coup d'état in Joseon overthrew Prince Gwanghae and placed King Injo on the throne.
1648, Pride's Purge in England: Members of Parliament who wished to continue political negotiations with Charles I were ejected from the House of Commons.  Those remaining—known as the Rump—went on to agree that the king should be put on trial for his life.
1653, England: On 20 April, Oliver Cromwell and forty musketeers under the command of Charles Worsley entered the House of Commons and forcibly dissolved the Rump Parliament, leading to Cromwell becoming Lord Protector and instigating military rule.
1660, Denmark: Frederick III of Denmark staged a coup in Copenhagen that instituted absolute monarchy in the country.
1688, Glorious Revolution in the British Isles: The Catholic James II was deposed by a faction favourable to the Protestant William of Orange.
1689, Boston Revolt in the Dominion of New England: In an action described by some as a "putsch", the Puritan militia, assisted by a Bostonian mob, arrested the unpopular governor, Sir Edmund Andros.

1700–1799

1703, Ottoman Empire: A Janissary revolt began in result of Treaty of Karlowitz, in which Mustafa II was deposed, which is known as Edirne event.
1730, Ottoman Empire: Janissary Patrona Halil instigated an uprising which resulted in the deposition of Ahmed III and the end of the Tulip era.
1756, Coup of 1756 in Sweden: Louisa Ulrika of Prussia, Queen of Sweden, attempted to abolish the rule of the Riksdag of the Estates and reinstate absolute monarchy in Sweden. The plot was exposed and subdued shortly before it was intended to begin.
1762, Russia: A coup by Catherine the Great forced the abdication of Peter III of Russia.
1769, Ethiopia: Ras Mikael Sehul deposed and killed Emperor Iyoas I of Ethiopia in a demonstration of power over the Ethiopian Throne. This action ushered in the Zemene Mesafint ("Era of the Princes"), a lengthy period of civil war and anarchy in Ethiopia.
1772, Denmark–Norway: A coup led by Juliana Maria of Brunswick-Wolfenbüttel and her son Frederick, Hereditary Prince of Denmark and Norway deposed the ruling cabinet minister Johann Friedrich Struensee.
1772, Revolution of 1772 in Sweden: King Gustav III performed a coup to introduce absolute monarchy against the Riksdag of the Estates, resulting in the end of the Age of liberty and the introduction of the Swedish Constitution of 1772.
1774, Nana Fadnavis, along with 11 other influential Sardars of the Maratha Empire, formed the Barbhai Counsil and overthrew Peshwa Raghunath Rao, who had seized the throne after killing his own nephew, Narayanrao. After his removal, Nana Fadnavis proclaimed 40-day-old son of Narayanrao, Madhavrao II as the next Peshwa, with himself acting as regent.
1784, Denmark–Norway: A coup is performed by the crown prince Frederick VI of Denmark against the ruling cabinet led by Ove Høegh-Guldberg.
1789, 1789 Conspiracy in Sweden: An attempted coup, with the purpose of deposing Gustav III of Sweden, was thwarted. 
1791, Poland: A political coup compelled the Polish diet to adopt a new constitution.
1793, Armfelt Conspiracy in Sweden: A coup by Gustaf Mauritz Armfelt, in companionship with Magdalena Rudenschöld, with the intent to depose the guardian government of Gustav IV Adolf of Sweden, was exposed.
1794, Fall of Maximilien Robespierre (also called the Coup d'état of 9 Thermidor) in France: Members of the Committee of Public Safety arrested and executed fellow Committee member Maximilien Robespierre.
1797, Coup of 18 Fructidor in France: The French Directory, with the support of the military, seizes power and ends the monarchist majority in Parliament.
1799, Coup of 18 Brumaire in France: A bloodless coup d'état overthrew the French Directory, replacing it with the French Consulate, and brought Napoléon Bonaparte to power.

1800–1899

1808, Rum Rebellion in New South Wales: A coup d'état by the New South Wales Corps deposed Governor William Bligh.
1809, Coup of 1809 in Sweden: Several army officers deposed King Gustav IV Adolf of Sweden while an army was marching on Stockholm.
1809, Iceland: Danish adventurer Jørgen Jørgensen arrested the governor of Iceland and made himself Protector, declaring the country independent from Denmark. Two months later, English warship  arrived and restored Danish government.
1812, Malet coup of 1812 in France: Republican General Claude François de Malet led a coup against Emperor Napoleon I.
 1815, France: Emperor Napoleon I staged a coup against King Louis XVIII of France, retaking his throne as Emperor of the French during the Hundred Days. 
 1815, Spain: Juan Díaz Porlier, with the support of the bourgeoisie and educated class, pronounced against King Ferdinand VII but was later betrayed.
 1820, Spain: A pronunciamiento by Spanish liberal Rafael del Riego forced the restoration of the Spanish Constitution of 1812, and began the Trienio Liberal.
 1822, Spain: The Royal Guard attempted an absolutist coup against King Ferdinand VII, which failed.
 1827, 1827 Honduran coup d'état, Dionisio de Herrera is overthrown by José Justo Milla and is imprisoned in Guatemala.
 1828, Bolivia: Military revolt in Chuquisaca wounded President Antonio José de Sucre, leading to his resignation.
 1828, Argentina: Unitarian Juan Lavalle deposed and executed federalist Manuel Dorrego as governor of Buenos Aires.
 1829, Mexico: Anastasio Bustamante overthrew and murdered President Vicente Guerrero.
 1832, Mexico: Mexican president Anastasio Bustamante was deposed for the first time by Antonio López de Santa Anna, and replaced by Melchor Múzquiz.
 1839, Bolivia: José Miguel de Velasco seized control of the government from Andrés de Santa Cruz during the dissolution of the Peru–Bolivian Confederation.
 1839, Mexico: Mexican president Anastasio Bustamante was deposed for the second time by Antonio López de Santa Anna.
 1841, Bolivia: Sebastián Ágreda overthrew José Miguel de Velasco, later installing the pro-Andrés de Santa Cruz politician Mariano Enrique Calvo as president.
 1841, Bolivia: José Ballivián deposed Mariano Enrique Calvo and returned Andrés de Santa Cruz to power.
 1842, Costa Rica: Francisco Morazán, former President of the Federal Republic of Central America, invaded the Free State of Costa Rica and seized power. He was later deposed by popular uprising and executed.
 1843, Spain: A successful Moderate pronunciamiento of Narváez and Francisco Serrano y Domínguez ended the Baldomero Espartero regency.
 1848, Bolivia: Manuel Isidoro Belzu overthrew Eusebio Guilarte and installed José Miguel de Velasco as president.
 1848, Bolivia: Manuel Isidoro Belzu turned on José Miguel de Velasco and overthrew him. An attempted counter-coup by Velasco failed.
 1851, 1851 French coup d'état: President of France Louis-Napoléon Bonaparte dissolved the Assembly and became the sole ruler of the country. In the following year, he restored the Empire by referendum.
 1854, Mexico: Following the Plan of Ayutla, Benito Juárez deposed Antonio López de Santa Anna and installed Juan Álvarez as President of Mexico.
 1854, Spanish Revolution of 1854: General Leopoldo O'Donnell led a successful revolutionary coup in Madrid. 
 1854, Bolivia: A military revolt failed to overthrow Manuel Isidoro Belzu.
 1857, Bolivia: José María Linares overthrew Jorge Córdova and Manuel Isidoro Belzu by proxy.
 1861, Bolivia: José María Linares was overthrown by his own ministerial cabinet, led by José María de Achá.
 1864, Mexico: Troops of French Emperor Napoleon III invaded Mexico and tried to install Habsburg pretender Maximilian as Emperor, but were defeated by Republican forces.
 1864, Bolivia:  Mariano Melgarejo rose up against José María de Achá and defeated his forces and those of Manuel Isidoro Belzu, who was also attempting to return to power. Melgarejo declared himself President of Bolivia.
 1866, Romania: Prince Alexandru Ioan Cuza of Romania was forced to abdicate by a political and military coalition.
 1867, Japan: Compelled by the Satchō Alliance, the Tokugawa shogunate returned political power to Emperor Meiji.
 1868, Glorious Revolution in Spain: A pronunciamiento of Juan Bautista Topete in Cádiz deposed Queen Isabella II.
 1870, 1870 Costa Rican coup d'état: Bruno Carranza came to power in Costa Rica after deposing President Jesús Jiménez Zamora. He resigned three months later.
 1871, Bolivia: Agustín Morales led a popular revolt against Mariano Melgarejo.
 1874,  in Spain: After Emilio Castelar lost a vote of confidence and a new government was to be instituted, Manuel Pavía y Rodríguez de Alburquerque ordered Congress to evacuate and formed a new government, giving power to Francisco Serrano.
 1874, Spain: Arsenio Martínez Campos overthrew the First Spanish Republic and installed Alfonso XII as king.
 1876, Costa Rica: Aniceto Esquivel Sáenz was deposed in a coup d'état led by Vicente Herrera Zeledón.
 1876, Mexico: Following the Plan of Tuxtepec, Porfirio Díaz overthrew Sebastián Lerdo de Tejada and installed himself as President of Mexico.
 1876, Bolivia: A military coup led by Hilarión Daza overthrew the president Tomás Frías Ametller and installed Hilarión Daza as President of Bolivia, leading to the War of the Pacific.
 1879, Bolivia: Hilarión Daza was deposed while fighting in the War of the Pacific.
 1884, Gapsin Coup in Korea: The Japanese-supported Gaehwa Party attempts to overthrow the Chinese-supported Joseon government, but is suppressed.
 1889, Proclamation of the Republic in Brazil: A military coup led by Marshal Deodoro da Fonseca deposed the Brazilian Emperor, Dom Pedro II, proclaimed the Republic, and installed a provisional government.

 1891, Brazil: President of Brazil Marshal Deodoro da Fonseca dissolved the National Congress and declared himself Dictator, but soon after resigned after the Navy rebellion.
 1893, Kingdom of Hawai'i: Sanford Dole and American plantation owners overthrew the independent Kingdom of Hawaii led by Queen Liliuokalani
 1895, 1895 Wilcox rebellion in the Kingdom of Hawai'i: Robert W. Wilcox unsuccessfully launched a coup in an attempt to restore the Hawaiian Monarchy.
 1895, Bahrain: Shubar al-Sitri launched an unsuccessful coup to depose the Bahraini monarchy.
 1898, Wilmington insurrection of 1898 (also known as the Wilmington coup and the Wilmington massacre) in the United States: White supremacists in Wilmington, North Carolina overthrew the biracial Fusionist government.
 1898, Qing dynasty (China): Empress Dowager Cixi launched the Wuxu coup in the Qing dynasty of China in response to the Hundred Days' Reform.
 1899, Bolivia: José Manuel Pando defeated Severo Fernández, bringing an end to the Federal War.
 1899, Venezuela: Cipriano Castro's army overthrew the government of Ignacio Andrade in Venezuela.

1900–1919

1903

 May Coup in Serbia: The Black Hand group of military officers, led by Colonel Dragutin Dimitrijević Apis, killed Alexander I of Serbia in coup d'état named Majski Prevrat (May Overthrow).

1905 

 Brazil: A failed military coup was led by Lauro Sodré after a week of civil disorder during the Vaccine Revolt.

1908

 Venezuela: Juan Vicente Gómez took the office as President of Venezuela after Cipriano Castro left for Europe to receive medical treatment.
 1908 bombardment of the Majlis in Iran: Persian Cossack forces, commanded by Vladimir Liakhov and the other Russian officers, bombarded and by that suppressed the Iranian parliament. Liakhov was subsequently made Military Governor of Tehran by the Shah of Persia, Mohammad Ali Shah Qajar.
Young Turk Revolution in the Ottoman Empire: The Committee of Union and Progress, a Young Turks organization, rebelled against the absolute rule of Sultan Abdul Hamid II which resulted in the restoration of the Ottoman constitution of 1876 and marked the beginning of the Second Constitutional Era and multi-party politics in the Ottoman Empire.

1909

 Goudi coup in Greece: A secret society of military officers called the Military League issued a pronunciamiento, resulting in the replacement of Prime Minister Dimitrios Rallis government and various reforms.
 31 March Incident in the Ottoman Empire: Shortly after the Young Turk Revolution, members of the military convened on Sultan Ahmet Square to demand reestablishment of Sharia. After a brief period of rival groups claiming to represent the legitimate government, the uprising was suppressed and the former government was ultimately restored.

1910
5 October 1910 revolution in Portugal: A republican coup d'état deposed King Manuel II of Portugal and established the Portuguese First Republic.

1912 

 1912 coup d'état in the Ottoman Empire: Members of the Savior Officers group in the army, a pro-Freedom and Accord Party clique, issued a memorandum to the Grand Vizier Mehmed Said Pasha to resign and dissolve parliament, which was overwhelmingly dominated by the CUP following the rigged 1912 election known as the "election of clubs". The Savior Officers got their wish, resulting in Ahmed Muhtar Pasha's Great Cabinet.

1913

1913 Ottoman coup d'état: Led by Talaat and Enver Pasha, the Committee of Union and Progress overthrew the Freedom and Accord Party coalition and introduced a military dictatorship, led by the Three Pashas.
Mexico: During the Ten Tragic Days, General Victoriano Huerta overthrew and murdered the president of Mexico, Francisco Madero.
United Kingdom: During the suffragette bombing and arson campaign, a plot to kidnap Home Secretary Reginald McKenna was revealed and discussed in the House of Commons and in the press. It was revealed that suffragettes were planning to kidnap one or more cabinet ministers and subjecting them to force-feeding, until they conceded women's suffrage. After the publicization of the plans, the plans were aborted.
United Kingdom: During the suffragette bombing and arson campaign, Special Branch detectives discovered that the WSPU had plans to create a suffragette "army" known as the "People's Training Corps" and informally as "Mrs Pankhurst's Army". The army was intended to proceed in force to Downing Street to imprison ministers until they conceded women's suffrage. After the discovery of the plans, they were aborted.

1916
Ethiopia: While touring the city of Harar, Lij Iyasu was deposed by a cabal of aristocrats in favor of his aunt Zewditu. Forces loyal to him were defeated at Segale, and Lij Iyasu wandered northwestern Ethiopia with a small band of loyal followers until captured five years later.
China: Yuan Shikai launched a self-coup by proclaiming himself emperor of the Chinese Empire.

1917
Costa Rica: President Alfredo González Flores was overthrown in a coup d'état led by General José Federico Alberto de Jesús Tinoco Granados, who established a repressive military dictatorship.
Manchu Restoration in China: Zhang Xun launched a coup in an attempt to restore the Qing monarchy. It was quickly reversed by Republican troops.
Russia: In August, the Russian Commander-in-Chief General Kornilov attempted a putsch, which was rapidly defeated.

1918
Russia: Alexander Kolchak overthrew the Provisional All-Russian Government and took control of the newly formed Russian State, establishing a military dictatorship.

1919
1919 Polish coup d'état attempt in Lithuania: The Polish right-wing unsuccessfully tried to overthrow the left-wing government.
Spartacist uprising in Germany: The German Communist Party unsuccessfully attempted to overthrow the government.
Hungarian Soviet Republic: István Friedrich overthrew the Hungarian Soviet Republic.

1920–1929

1920
Kapp Putsch in Germany: The Marinebrigade Ehrhardt failed to overthrow Germany's Weimar Republic.
1920 Georgian coup attempt in the Democratic Republic of Georgia: The Bolsheviks failed to overthrow the Democratic Republic of Georgia with the help of the Soviet Russian Red Army.
Bolivia: 21 years of continuous single-party democratic rule ended when Bautista Saavedra overthrew José Gutiérrez Guerra.
Plan of Agua Prieta in Mexico: General Álvaro Obregón, backed by labor unions and Zapatistas, ousted Mexican President Venustiano Carranza.

1921
Iran: Colonel Reza Khan, with Zia'eddin Tabatabaee, launched a coup against Ahmad Shah Qajar.
Charles IV attempts to retake the throne in Hungary: The former King Charles I of Austria, who had also reigned as Charles IV of Hungary, returned to Hungary twice to try, unsuccessfully, to retake his throne from Regent Miklós Horthy.

1922

Greece: Following the defeat in the Asia Minor Campaign, Venizelist army officers, chief amongst them Nikolaos Plastiras and Stylianos Gonatas, led the Greek Army in revolt against the royal government and forced the renewed abdication of King Constantine I of Greece.
Albania: A failed coup d'état attempt was led by Bajram Curri, Elez Isufi, Hamit Toptani and Halit Lleshi.
March on Rome in Italy: Between 27 and 29 October, the March on Rome by the Blackshirts led to the installation of Benito Mussolini of the National Fascist Party as prime minister of the Kingdom of Italy, supported by King Victor Emmanuel III. After the election of 1924 and the assassination of Giacomo Matteotti, Mussolini established a dictatorship on 3 January 1925.

1923
Spain: Miguel Primo de Rivera installed a dictatorship in Spain without overthrowing King Alfonso XIII.
1923 Bulgarian coup d'état: The military, under the control of General Ivan Valkov, overthrew the Bulgarian Agrarian National Union government of Aleksandar Stamboliyski and installed one headed by Aleksandar Tsankov.
September uprising (14–29 September 1923). The September Uprising (Bulgarian: Септемврийско въстание, Septemvriysko vastanie) was an armed insurgency staged in September 1923 by the Bulgarian Communist Party (BCP) under Comintern pressure and attempted to overthrow Alexander Tsankov's new government of Bulgaria that had come to power with the coup d'état of 9 June. Besides its communist base, the uprising was also supported by agrarians and anarchists. The uprising's goal was the "establishment of a government of workers and peasants" in Bulgaria.
Beer Hall Putsch in Germany: A failed coup was attempted by Nazi party leader Adolf Hitler in Germany against the leaders of the Weimar Republic. The Nazis were repelled by police, and Hitler was later charged with treason.
Leonardopoulos–Gargalidis coup d'état attempt in Greece: Pro-royalist military officers attempted to stage a coup, and successfully took control of much of the Greek mainland. However, the government rallied its forces, and leaders Georgios Leonardopoulos and Panagiotis Gargalidis were ultimately surrounded and forced to surrender.

1924
Chile: President Arturo Alessandri resigned and fled after the army, led by Luis Altamirano, headed a coup.
1924 Estonian coup d'état attempt: Communists attempted a coup against the Estonian government, but their multiple attacks were repelled. Multiple organizers were executed; some escaped to the Soviet Union, but were later executed during the Great Purge.
June Revolution in Albania: A coup d'état overthrew the pro-Ahmet Zogu government and established a leftist government led by Fan Noli. On December 24 of that year, Zogu returned to power, and Noli and his government fled from the country.
Beijing Coup in China: On 23 October, Warlord Feng Yü-hsiang seized Beijing from Chinese President Cao Kun at a crucial moment during the Second Zhili–Fengtian War.

1925
Chile: General Carlos Ibáñez del Campo and Colonel Marmaduque Grove deposed the military ruler of Chile, Luis Altamirano. They later allowed former president Arturo Alessandri to return to Chile.
Greece: General Theodoros Pangalos seized power in a coup in Athens, Greece.

1926

May Coup in Poland: Marshal Józef Piłsudski overthrew the democratically elected government of President Stanisław Wojciechowski and Prime Minister Wincenty Witos. A new government was installed, headed by Kazimierz Bartel.
28 May 1926 coup d'état in Portugal: Nationalist military forces overthrew the unstable Portuguese First Republic and instituted a new regime, the National Dictatorship.
1926 Lithuanian coup d'état: A military-organized coup resulted in the replacement of the democratically elected Lithuanian government with a conservative authoritarian government led by Antanas Smetona.
Greece: The dictatorship of General Theodoros Pangalos was overthrown by General Georgios Kondylis.
Spain: A failed coup was attempted against the dictatorship of Miguel Primo de Rivera.

1928
Ethiopia: Balcha Safo attempted a coup against regent Ras Tafari Makonnen (who would later become Emperor Haile Selassie I); the uprising never amounted to more than a show of force and was put down decisively by Kassa Haile Darge. Balcha Safo surrendered and was imprisoned.
Ethiopian coup d'état of 1928: Supporters of Empress Zewditu attempted to eliminate the heir apparent and Crown Prince Tafari Makonnen; the coup d'état ended in failure.

1929
1929 Tuvan coup d'état in the Tuvan People's Republic: Five Tuvan youths supported by the Soviet Union successfully overthrew the government, and one of them, Salchak Toka, became supreme ruler.

1930–1939

1930
Gugsa Wale's rebellion in Ethiopia: An uprising by Ras Gugsa Wale against King Tafari Makonnen (later Emperor Haile Selassie I) was put down decisively at the Battle of Anchem by the Minister of War, Ras Mulugeta Yeggazu.
Bolivia: General Carlos Blanco Galindo overthrew the ministerial cabinet, which had been operating as the Bolivian executive power since the resignation of Hernando Siles Reyes the month prior.
Dominican Republic: Rafael Leónidas Trujillo declared martial law, deposing Horacio Vásquez after a devastating hurricane.
1930 Argentine coup d'état: General José Félix Uriburu overthrew President Hipólito Yrigoyen.
Brazilian Revolution of 1930: An armed revolution culminated in a coup d'état which ousted President Washington Luís and established the Brazilian military junta of 1930.
Peru: Luis Miguel Sánchez Cerro overthrew Augusto B. Leguía y Salcedo.

1931
March Incident in Japan: The radical, ultranationalist Sakurakai secret society attempted to start large-scale riots in Tokyo, which instigators hoped would lead to martial law and then a coup d'état by the Imperial Japanese Army. Two attempts to start riots failed, and the leaders of the plot were arrested.
October Incident in Japan: The Sakurakai again plotted a coup, this time to be instigated by assassinations of key statesmen and officials. The plot was foiled by some of the plotters abandoning the effort, and leaks that reached the War Minister of Japan.
1931 Salvadoran coup d'état: On 2 December, Arturo Araujo was overthrown by Maximiliano Hernández Martínez.

1932

Preußenschlag in the Free State of Prussia in the Weimar Republic: Chancellor Franz von Papen successfully took over the Free State of Prussia, the largest constituent state of the Weimar Republic, by using an emergency decree issued by President Paul von Hindenburg.
Mäntsälä Rebellion in Finland: An attempted coup by the Lapua Movement failed. According to some contemporaries, if the coup had been successful, then Vihtori Kosola, the leader of the movement, would have become a fascist dictator of Finland.
15 May Incident in Japan: Reactionary elements of the Imperial Japanese Navy successfully assassinated Prime Minister Inukai Tsuyoshi, but the coup was otherwise unsuccessful.
Siamese coup d'état of 1932: A bloodless transition occurred, marking the change from the absolute monarchy of Siam to a constitutional monarchy, the introduction of democracy and the first constitution of Thailand, and the creation of the National Assembly of Thailand.
Chile: A coup headed by the Chilean military deposed President Juan Esteban Montero and created the Socialist Republic of Chile. After twelve days, other army officers headed a counter-coup and ended the Socialist Republic, and the new provisional president, Abraham Oyanedel, restored democracy.
Spain: José Sanjurjo failed to overthrow Manuel Azaña.
 1932 Colonial Building riot in St. John's, Newfoundland: On 5 April 1932, prompted by the Great Depression and corruption in the Squires administration, a peaceful protest degenerated into riots and violence. The riots led to the fall of the Squires government and the defeat of Squires's Liberal Party.

1933
Uruguay: The president of Uruguay, Gabriel Terra, dissolved Parliament and headed a coup.
Sergeants' Revolt in Cuba: Fulgencio Batista ousted Carlos Manuel de Céspedes y Quesada.
Business Plot (also called the Wall Street Putsch or the White House Putsch) in the United States: Retired Marine Corps Major General Smedley Butler asserted that wealthy businessmen were plotting to create a fascist veterans' organization with Butler as its leader and use it in a coup d'état to overthrow Roosevelt. While historians have questioned whether or not a coup was actually close to execution, most agree that some sort of "wild scheme" was contemplated and discussed.
1933 Siamese coup d'état: Colonel Phraya Phahol Pholphayuhasena led a peaceful coup against Premier Phraya Manopakorn Nititada

1934
Estonia: Konstantin Päts carried out a self-coup on 12 March.
1934 Latvian coup d'état: Kārlis Ulmanis carried out a self-coup against the parliamentary system.
1934 Bulgarian coup d'état: The Zveno military organization and the Military Union, with the aid of the Bulgarian Army, overthrew the government of the wide Popular Bloc coalition and replaced it with one under Kimon Georgiev.
1934 Lithuanian coup d'état attempt: Supporters of the former Prime Minister Augustinas Voldemaras attempted to overthrow the government of President Antanas Smetona.
July Putsch in Austria: On 25–30 July, Austrian Nazis, attempted a coup against the Austrofascist regime. Although they succeeded in resulting in the assassinating chancellor Engelbert Dollfuss, Kurt Schuschnigg succeeded him and the Austrofascist regime remained in power.
: A coup on 15 January overthrew provisional president Ramón Grau. A second coup three days later overthrew his replacement, Carlos Hevia, and installed Carlos Mendieta as president.
Bolivia: Bolivian generals deposed President Daniel Salamanca in the midst of the Chaco War.

1935
Greek coup attempt of 1935: A Venizelist coup attempt, headed by Nikolaos Plastiras against the People's Party government of Panagis Tsaldaris, failed.
Mexico: In an internal coup, Lázaro Cárdenas deported and exiled President Plutarco Elías Calles, effectively ending Calles' control over the Mexican government.
Greece: General Georgios Kondylis deposed the sitting government and abolished the Republic, restoring the Greek monarchy.

1936

Xi'an Incident in China: General Chiang Kai-shek was kidnapped by his deputy Zhang Xueliang, who demanded that Chiang stop fighting the Chinese Communists and instead agree to a united resistance against the Japanese. His wife's and her brother's subsequent negotiation with Zhang ensured Chiang's release two weeks later.
 1936 Bolivian coup d'état: Germán Busch overthrew José Luis Tejada Sorzano and handed the presidency to David Toro.
 Spanish coup of July 1936: Nationalists seized control of parts of Spain, commencing the Spanish Civil War. Later, General Francisco Franco assumed control of the country as dictator.
February 26 Incident in Japan: A coup attempt by junior military officers failed in installing a militarist government.
Greece: A coup of Ioannis Metaxas on 4 August established the 4th of August Regime.
Kingdom of Iraq: A 30 October coup by Bakr Sidqi and Hikmat Sulayman deposed Prime Minister Yasin al-Hashimi.

1937
France: A Cagoulard plot to install a pro-Nazi government was foiled by French police.
Bolivia: Dissatisfied with the speed of new reforms, Germán Busch led a popular movement which secured the resignation of David Toro.
Brazil: President Getúlio Vargas, governing democratically since 1934, launched a self-coup and became the Dictator of the Brazilian Estado Novo ("New State").

1938
Romania: King Carol II of Romania launched a self-coup, which abolished parliamentary democracy in favor of a royal dictatorship.
Brazil: Vargas forces detected the attempted Integralist coup, leading to a shootout with insurgents at the Guanabara Palace.

1939
Casado's coup in Spain: A coup by military officers and members of the Spanish Socialist Workers' Party in the Republican zone of Spain resulted in the formation of the National Defence Council as a step towards a negotiated peace with the Nationalists. The negotiations eventually failed, but the coup signaled the end of the Spanish Civil War.

1940–1949

1940
Norway: The fascist politician Vidkun Quisling attempted to overthrow the Norwegian government in response to the German invasion of Denmark and Norway.
Occupation of the Baltic States in Estonia, Latvia, and Lithuania: Several Soviet-organised coups occurred during the Soviet takeover of the Baltic States.
Mexico: Juan Andreu Almazán attempted a coup to prevent the inauguration of president-elect Manuel Ávila Camacho.

1941
Legionnaires' Rebellion in Romania: Iron Guard paramilitaries (also known as Legionnaires) unsuccessfully attempted to overthrow Conducător Ion Antonescu.
1941 Iraqi coup d'état: Pro-German Rashid Ali Al-Gaylani and the Golden Square overthrew the regime of the Pro-British Regent 'Abd al-Ilah, leading to the Anglo-Iraqi War.
Yugoslav coup d'état: Pro-British King Peter II and his supporters staged a coup in the Kingdom of Yugoslavia to replace pro-German Regent Prince Paul, leading to the Axis invasion of Yugoslavia.

1942
Coup attempt in Algeria: French Resistance fighters staged a coup in Algiers in the night before Operation Torch.

1943
1943 Argentine coup d'état: Arturo Rawson overthrew Ramón Castillo.
Fall of the Fascist regime in Italy: A coup on 24–25 July culminated with a vote of no confidence against Fascist dictator Benito Mussolini, ending 21 years of Fascist rule in the Kingdom of Italy. He was replaced by Marshal Pietro Badoglio.
Bolivia: Left-wing military officers and opposition militants of the Revolutionary Nationalist Movement under Gualberto Villarroel overthrew Enrique Peñaranda.

1944

Palm Sunday Coup in El Salvador: On 2 April, the army attempted to oust President Maximiliano Hernández Martínez.
20 July plot in Germany: Part of Operation Valkyrie, the German resistance and German Reserve Army attempted to kill Adolf Hitler and seize control of the Third Reich in order to negotiate peace with the Allies. The coup failed after it was found Hitler did not die in the bomb blast, and the Reserve Army began to refuse to take orders from the German resistance. 5,000 conspirators were given show trials and summarily executed.
King Michael's Coup in Romania: On 23 August, pro-German dictator Ion Antonescu was overthrown and King Michael of Romania switched the nation from the Axis side of the war to join the Allies.
1944 Bulgarian coup d'état: The government of pro-German Prime Minister Konstantin Muraviev was overthrown, and Kimon Georgiev of the Fatherland Front switched the nation from the Axis side of the war to join the Allies.
Operation Panzerfaust in Hungary: Nazi Germany forcefully replaced the royalist Hungarian government of Regent Miklós Horthy with the pro-Nazi Government of National Unity, led by Ferenc Szálasi.
El Salvador: On 20 October, Andrés Ignacio Menéndez was overthrown by Osmín Aguirre y Salinas.

1945
Kyūjō incident: 
1945 Brazilian coup d'état: Getúlio Vargas's government ended in a coup led by General Mourão, one of his former supporters.
1945 Venezuelan coup d'état: Isaías Medina Angarita was overthrown in a coup, and Rómulo Betancourt was appointed to lead a civilian–military junta.

1946 

 Overthrow of Gualberto Villarroel in Bolivia: An enraged mob stormed the Government Palace and lynched President Gualberto Villarroel.

1947
1947 Thai coup d'état: A coup against Thawan Thamrongnawasawat resulted in the return of Plaek Phibunsongkhram.
Hungary: The democratically elected Prime Minister Ferenc Nagy stepped down in the face of blackmail from the Hungarian Communist Party, and was replaced by Lajos Dinnyés. 
Romania: King Michael was forced to abdicate and leave the country at the hands of the Romanian Communist Party.

1948
1948 Czechoslovak coup d'état: The Communist Party of Czechoslovakia, backed by the Soviets, asserted control over the government of Czechoslovakia, beginning four decades of communist rule.
Venezuela: The democratically elected government of Rómulo Gallegos was overthrown, and a military junta was installed with Carlos Delgado Chalbaud as its leader.
Alwaziri coup in the Mutawakkilite Kingdom of Yemen: Imam Yahya Muhammad Hamid ed-Din was killed and the rival Sayyid family, the Alwazirs, seized power for several weeks.
El Salvador: On 14 December, Salvador Castaneda Castro was overthrown in a coup led by many younger military officers.

1949
March 1949 Syrian coup d'état: A bloodless military coup by U.S.-backed general Husni al-Za'im overthrew elected President Shukri al-Quwatli, allowing passage of the Trans-Arabian Pipeline. al-Za'im became President of Syria, and Muhsin al-Barazi became Prime Minister.
Syria: In August, Sami al-Hinnawi, along with several other officers of the Syrian Social Nationalist Party, executed al-Za'im and al-Barazi, and installed Hashim al-Atassi as president.
Syria: In December, Adib Shishakli led a military coup. He kept al-Atassi as president, but arrested Sami al-Hinnawi to end Hashemite influence in Syria.

1950–1959

1951
Manhattan Rebellion in Thailand: A coup attempt by officers of the Royal Thai Navy against the government of Prime Minister Plaek Phibunsongkhram failed on 29–30 June.
Silent Coup (also called the Radio Coup) in Thailand: The Army-led National Military Council announced the dissolution of parliament, reinstatement of the 1932 constitution, and formation of a provisional government on 29 November.
Rawalpindi conspiracy in Pakistan: There was an unsuccessful coup attempt, planned by Major-General Akbar Khan of the Pakistani army against the government of Liaquat Ali Khan.
Argentina: A military coup attempt against Juan Perón was unsuccessful.
Bolivia: President Mamerto Urriolagoitía enacted a self-coup, known as the Mamertazo, and resigned in favor of General Hugo Ballivián in order to prevent elected reformist Víctor Paz Estenssoro from taking office.

1952
Bolivian National Revolution: General Hugo Ballivián was overthrown by Hernán Siles Zuazo, who then ceded command to Víctor Paz Estenssoro. Paz had won the 1951 election, but was prevented from assuming office by self-coup.
Egyptian revolution of 1952: A group of army officers led by Mohammed Naguib and Gamal Abdel Nasser overthrew King Farouk and the Muhammad Ali Dynasty.
Cuba: Fulgencio Batista led a bloodless coup to topple the democratically elected government.

1953

1953 Iranian coup d'état: A coup, jointly led by the United States and United Kingdom and codenamed Operation Ajax, overthrew Prime Minister Mohammed Mosaddeq.
 1953 Pakistani constitutional coup:  Governor-General Ghulam Mohammad, supported by Field Marshal Ayub Khan, dismissed the prime minister and dissolved the Constituent Assembly.

1954
1954 Guatemalan coup d'état: The democratically elected government of Colonel Jacobo Arbenz Guzmán was ousted by Colonel Carlos Castillo Armas in an operation organized by the American Central Intelligence Agency and codenamed Operation PBSuccess.
Paraguay: A military coup brings Alfredo Stroessner to power.
Coup d'état of Yanaon: A coup d'état led by Dadala Raphael Ramanayya overthrew French rule in Yanaon, a French colony in India.
Brazil: A coup attempt led by Carlos Lacerda and Eduardo Gomes culminated in the murder of an Air Force officer. A member of President Getúlio Vargas's personal guard was implicated in the killing, which led to anger in the military and to generals demanding Vargas's resignation. Following growing unrest, Vargas killed himself, and was succeeded by Café Filho.

1955

Brazil: A counter-coup led by Marshal Henrique Teixeira Lott overthrew the government of Carlos Luz and prevented a coup against the elected president Juscelino Kubitschek.
Revolución Libertadora in Argentina: A military coup overthrew President Juan Perón.

1956
Cuba: A military coup attempt, led by Colonel Ramón Barquín against President Fulgencio Batista, was unsuccessful.

1957
Colombia: The military supported strikes and student riots, and deposed Gustavo Rojas Pinilla, giving power to the Colombian Military Junta and chairman Gabriel París Gordillo.
Fatti di Rovereta in San Marino: A quasi-coup led to the coexistence of two governments for a month.
1957 coup in Thailand: A coup by members of the Royal Thai Army, under the command of Field Marshal Sarit Thanarat, resulted in the ouster and exile of Plaek Phibunsongkhram.
Anti-Party Group coup attempt in the Soviet Union: A group of leaders within the Communist Party of the Soviet Union, who would latter be dubbed the "anti-party group" by Premier Nikita Khrushchev, unsuccessfully attempted to depose Khrushchev as General Secretary of the Party.
Overthrow of provisional president Daniel Fignolé in Haiti.

1958
Venezuela: After three weeks of protests, the Venezuelan military removed Marcos Pérez Jiménez and installed Wolfgang Larrazábal, commander of the Venezuelan Navy.
Pakistan: Army Chief and Defence Minister General Ayub Khan led a military coup to overthrow the government of Iskander Mirza.
14 July Revolution in Iraq: The Hashemite monarchy was overthrown and the Iraqi Republic was established, with Abd al-Karim Qasim as Prime Minister. 
May 1958 crisis in France: General Jacques Massu took over Algiers and threatened to invade Paris unless Charles de Gaulle became head of state.

1959
1959 Mosul uprising in Iraq: A coup attempt by Arab nationalists against Prime Minister Abd al-Karim Qasim failed.
Brazil: Air Force military hijacked a civilian airplane and attempted a coup against Juscelino Kubitschek.
Cuban Revolution: A successful coup against Fulgencio Batista, led by Fidel Castro, established a communist-ruled Cuba.
1959 Laotian coup: Phoumi Nosavan took control of Laos in a bloodless coup.

1960–1969

1960
1960 Turkish coup d'état: A coup against the Democrat Party government resulted in the institution of the Turkish Constitution of 1961.
First Mobutu coup in the Democratic Republic of the Congo: A bloodless coup launched by Joseph-Désiré Mobutu replaced both President Joseph Kasa-Vubu and Prime Minister Patrice Lumumba with a College of Commissionaires-General, consisting of a panel of university graduates led by Justin Bomboko.
1960 Ethiopian coup d'état attempt: A group failed to overthrow Emperor Haile Selassie during a state visit.
1960 Laotian coups: Phoumi Nosavan, who came to power after a coup the previous year, was overthrown in August 1960 by his former ally Kong Le. A three-way conflict ensued, and an attempt by Kouprasith Abhay to seize power from Kong Le failed. Following the Battle of Vientiane, Phoumi Nosavan regained power.
El Salvador: On 26 October, José María Lemus was overthrown by the Junta of Government.
1960 Nepal coup d'état in Nepal: On 15 December, King Mahendra of Nepal dismissed the cabinet of B. P. Koirala and imprisoned Koirala.

1961
El Salvador: On 25 January, the Civic-Military Directory overthrew the Junta of Government.
May 16 coup in South Korea: Park Chung Hee led a coup, ending the Second Republic of South Korea and establishing the Supreme Council for National Reconstruction.
Sanmu Incident in Japan: Right-wing extremists from the Japan Self-Defense Forces attempted a coup, but were foiled by the National Police Agency.
Algiers putsch of 1961 in France: In the midst of the Algerian War, four retired Army generals failed to overthrow president Charles de Gaulle, who himself came to power through the 1958 military coup d'état.
1961 revolt in Somalia: A group of military officers failed in an attempt to dismantle the union of the two states of Somaliland and Somalia.

1962
Coup of 29 March 1962 in Argentina: President Arturo Frondizi was overthrown by the military while abroad, and José María Guido became president.
Yemen: A military coup in Mutawakkilite Kingdom of Yemen began the North Yemen Civil War.
1962 Ceylonese coup d'état attempt: Christian officers in Ceylon (now Sri Lanka) failed to overthrow the government of Prime Minister Sirimavo Bandaranaike.
1962 Burmese coup d'état: A coup led by General Ne Win overthrew the constitutionally elected government of Prime Minister U Nu.

1963
Guatemala: Miguel Ydígoras Fuentes was overthrown by the military. Enrique Peralta Azurdia took power and established the Institutional Democratic Party until elections took place in 1966.
Dominican Republic: The military overthrew President Juan Bosch in September 1963, only seven months into his term as the first democratically elected president in the Dominican Republic since 1924. Bosch was replaced by a junta until it was overthrown in 1965.
Turkey: A military coup attempt failed in Turkey.
1963 South Vietnamese coup: A group of officers in the Army of the Republic of Vietnam, supported by the United States, deposed President Ngô Đình Diệm and the Personalist Labor Revolutionary Party.
Ecuador: A military coup occurred.
1963 Togolese coup d'état in Togo: Coup leaders including Emmanuel Bodjollé, Étienne Eyadéma (later Gnassingbé Eyadéma), and Kléber Dadjo took over government buildings, arrested most of the cabinet, and assassinated Togo's first president, Sylvanus Olympio, outside the American embassy in Lomé. Nicolas Grunitzky and Antoine Meatchi, both exiled political opponents of Olympio, formed a new government.
1963 Dahomeyan coup d'état: Christophe Soglo took control of the Republic of Dahomey (later Benin).
Ramadan Revolution (also known as the 8 February Revolution) in Iraq: The Ba'ath Party's Iraqi wing overthrew Prime Minister Abd al-Karim Qasim.
1963 Syrian coup d'état (also known as the 8 March Revolution): The military committee of the Syrian Regional Branch of the Arab Socialist Ba'ath Party seized power, overthrowing President Nazim al-Kudsi and beginning Ba'athist rule in Syria.
 1963 Honduran coup d'état: The military overthrew the democratic government of Honduras ten days before a scheduled election. Oswaldo López Arellano took power from Ramón Villeda Morales, preventing the likely succession of Modesto Rodas Alvarado.
November 1963 Iraqi coup d'état: Pro-Nasserist Iraqi officers within the Ba'ath Party led a successful coup.

1964
 Piano Solo in Italy: A plot for an Italian coup was created in 1964 at the request of then president of the Italian Republic, Antonio Segni.
 Zanzibar Revolution: Local revolutionaries overthrow Sultan Jamshid bin Abdullah, ending the Sultanate of Zanzibar and establishing the People's Republic of Zanzibar and Pemba.
 1964 Brazilian coup d'état: Humberto Castelo Branco was installed as president after a military coup overthrew João Goulart.
 January 1964 South Vietnamese coup: A military coup overthrew Dương Văn Minh's military junta.
1964 Bolivian coup d'état: Vice President René Barrientos and General Alfredo Ovando Candía overthrew President Víctor Paz Estenssoro.
 1964 Gabonese coup d'état: Gabonese military officers overthrew President Léon M'ba and established a provisional government with Jean-Hilaire Aubame as president. The provisional government was toppled shortly afterwards with the help of France, and M'ba was reinstated.
 1964 Laotian coups: Policemen of the Directorate of National Coordination overthrew the Royal Lao Government in April, but the successful coup was overturned five days later by U.S. Ambassador Leonard Unger. In August, a second coup was attempted when Defense Minister Phoumi Nosavan tried to take over Vientiane with a training battalion; this was quickly quashed by the Royal Laotian Army's troops.

1965
1965 Bulgarian coup d'état attempt: A conspiracy by officials in the Bulgarian Communist Party and officers in the Bulgarian People's Army to overthrow Todor Zhivkov was uncovered, and foiled before the coup could be carried out.
1965 Algerian coup d'état: After a military coup in Algeria, Defense Minister Colonel Houari Boumedienne took power.
Indonesia: Members of the Indonesian National Armed Forces calling themselves the 30 September Movement began a coup attempt and assassinated six Indonesian Army generals. The attempted coup failed, and was blamed on the Communist Party of Indonesia, which led to a mass purge of actual and suspected members of the party and sympathizers. While who is behind the initial coup is still being debated, Major General Suharto took advantage of the chaos to exile First Indonesian President Sukarno and install a dictatorship that would last until 1998 a couple years later.
Second Mobutu coup in the Democratic Republic of the Congo: Mobutu Sese Seko seized power in a bloodless coup after Parliament twice refused to confirm Évariste Kimba as Prime Minister.
1965 Burundian coup d'état attempt: A group of ethnic Hutu officers from the Burundian military wounded the Prime Minister of Burundi, but ultimately failed to overthrow the government.
Saint-Sylvestre coup d'état in the Central African Republic: Central African Republic army leader Jean-Bédel Bokassa and his military officers staged a coup against the government of President David Dacko.
1965 Laotian coups: Two simultaneous and independent January coups failed. One was led by General Phoumi Nosavan, who had participated in four prior coup attempts against the Royal Lao Government; the other was led by Colonel Bounleuth Saycocie.

1966
Operation Cold Chop in Ghana: The Ghana Armed Forces, led by Colonel Emmanuel Kwasi Kotoka, overthrew Kwame Nkrumah while he was abroad. The National Liberation Council was formed, and Lieutenant General Joseph Arthur Ankrah was installed as chairman.
1966 Upper Voltan coup d'état in Upper Volta (now Burkina Faso): On 3 January, Sangoulé Lamizana overthrew Maurice Yaméogo.
1966 Syrian coup d'état: The ruling National Command of the Arab Socialist Ba'ath Party were removed from power by a union of the party's Military Committee and the Regional Command, under the leadership of Salah Jadid.
1966 Nigerian coup d'état: In January, mutinous Nigerian soldiers led by Chukwuma Kaduna Nzeogwu and Emmanuel Ifeajuna killed 22 people including the Prime Minister of Nigeria and many senior politicians and Army officers. The General Officer Commanding the Nigerian Army, Johnson Aguiyi-Ironsi, was compelled to take control of the government.
Abu Dhabi: Shakhbut bin Sultan Al Nahyan was deposed in a bloodless coup and replaced by his brother, Zayed bin Sultan Al Nahyan.
1966 Nigerian counter-coup: In a reaction to the January coup, Johnson Aguiyi-Ironsi was assassinated, and conspirators appointed Yakubu Gowon as head of state.
Argentine Revolution: President Arturo Illia was overthrown by military forces supporting the leadership of General Juan Carlos Onganía, who became de facto president.
1966 alleged Ceylonese coup d'état attempt (also known as the Bathroom coup): 31 suspects, including the commander of the army, were arrested for allegedly plotting to overthrow the government of Dudley Senanayake. They were later unanimously acquitted.
 1966 Laotian coup d'état: General Thao Ma, who wished to reserve the transports Royal Lao Air Force for strictly military use, was forced into exile by fellow generals angling to use the transports for smuggling opium and gold.
 Saudi Arabia: A coup attempt against King Faisal failed.

1967
Coup d'état of 21 April in Greece: A group of colonels overthrew the caretaker government a month before scheduled elections which Georgios Papandreou's Centre Union was favoured to win.
Operation Guitar Boy in Ghana: A coup attempt led by a group of junior officers of the Ghana Armed Forces resulted in the assassination of Lieutenant General Emmanuel Kwasi Kotoka, Ghana's Chief of the Defence Staff. However, the coup itself was unsuccessful.
Togo: In a bloodless coup, Gnassingbé Eyadéma overthrew Nicolas Grunitzky and began a 38-year rule.
1967 coups in Sierra Leone: On 21 March, Brigadier David Lansana led a bloodless military coup against Prime Minister Siaka Stevens, who had taken office hours earlier after a closely contested election. Lansana declared himself interim leader, placing Stevens under house arrest and later releasing him, at which point Stevens went into exile. On 23 March, Brigadier Andrew Juxon-Smith led a group of military officers to seize control of the government, arrest Lansana, and suspend the constitution. They established the National Reformation Council and made Juxon-Smith the chairman.
Biafra: Biafran Army colonel Victor Banjo plotted a coup against Biafran President Odumegwu Ojukwu. The coup plot was uncovered by an informant, and Banjo and two other conspirators were executed on 22 September.
Transition to the New Order in Indonesia: Suharto overthrew Sukarno in a military coup in Indonesia, beginning the New Order and Suharto's 31-year presidency.

1968
1968 Panamanian coup d'état: A military coup overthrew President Arnulfo Arias Madrid.
17 July Revolution in Iraq: A bloodless coup led by Ahmed Hassan al-Bakr, Abd ar-Razzaq an-Naif, and Abd ar-Rahman al-Dawud ousted President Abdul Rahman Arif and Prime Minister Tahir Yahya and brought the Iraqi Regional Branch of the Arab Socialist Ba'ath Party to power. 
1968 Peruvian coup d'état: General Juan Velasco Alvarado led a coup against President Fernando Belaúnde.
Sergeants' Coup in Sierra Leone: A military coup against Brigadier Andrew Juxon-Smith by Brigadier John Amadu Bangura restored Siaka Stevens as Prime Minister.
 1968 Malian coup d'état: Lieutenant Moussa Traore led a bloodless military coup against President Modibo Keita.

1969
1969 Libyan coup d'état (also known as the al-Fateh Revolution or the 1 September Revolution): Muammar al-Gaddafi led a group of military officers to overthrow the monarchy of King Idris, resulting in the abolition of the Libyan monarchy and establishment of the Libyan Arab Republic.
1969 Sudanese coup d'état: Colonel Gaafar Nimeiry led a military coup to overthrow the government of President Ismail al-Azhari.
Brazilian military junta of 1969: Pedro Aleixo, the legal vice president of Brazil, was replaced by a military junta after Artur da Costa e Silva suffered a stroke.
1969 Saudi Arabian coup d'état attempt: A failed coup d'état, planned by numerous high-ranking members of the Royal Saudi Air Force, resulted in King Faisal ordering the arrest of hundreds of military officers.
Bolivia: General Alfredo Ovando Candía overthrew President Luis Adolfo Siles Salinas.
1969 Somali coup d'état: Military officers led by Siad Barre overthrew President Sheikh Mukhtar Mohamed Hussein and Prime Minister Mohammad Egal, leading to Barre's 21-year-long military rule and the imposition of an authoritarian government.

1970–1979

1970
Corrective Revolution in Syria: Hafez al-Assad overthrew the government of Salah Jadid in a bloodless coup.
Bolivia: A junta of commanders of the Bolivian army enact a coup, but the highly polarized military forces were split. President Alfredo Ovando Candía sought asylum in a foreign embassy, believing all hope was lost, but leftist military forces reasserted control under the leadership of General Juan José Torres. Embarrassed by his quick abandonment of the fight and exhausted by a grueling 13 months in office, Ovando agreed to leave the presidency in Torres's hands.
1970 Omani coup d'état: Qaboos bin Said, with the support of the British, ousted his father Said bin Taimur in a bloodless coup during the Dhofar Rebellion.
Golpe Borghese (Borghese Coup) in Italy: A coup plot in Italy by neo-fascist groups failed to materialize.
Mishima Incident in Japan: After barricading the headquarters of the Eastern Command of the Japan Self-Defense Forces and tying the commandant to a chair, Yukio Mishima, the leader of the Tatenokai, delivered a speech to soldiers gathered outside, intending to inspire a coup. After this failed, Mishima committed seppuku.
1970 Cambodian coup d'état: Chief of State Norodom Sihanouk was ousted in a military coup, and Prime Minister Lon Nol took power.
Chile: With the United States Central Intelligence Agency strongly invested in Salvador Allende not coming to power in the 1970 Chilean presidential election, the CIA discussed several possible coup options.

1971
 1971 Turkish military memorandum: The Chief of the General Staff of the Turkish Armed Forces delivered a memorandum demanding the formation of a "strong and credible government, which will neutralise the current anarchical situation".
 1971 Ugandan coup d'état: A military coup led by General Idi Amin overthrew the government of President Milton Obote while he was abroad, and installed Amin as dictator.
 Thailand: Prime Minister Thanom Kittikachorn launched a self-coup against his own government, dissolving parliament and appointing himself Chairman of the National Executive Council.
 1971 Sudanese coup d'état: Major Hashem al Atta leads a short-lived coup against the government of the Democratic Republic of the Sudan and President Jaafar Nimeiry. Several days later, Nimeiry loyalists enacted a counter-coup, toppling Atta's government and executing him.
 Project 571 in China: An alleged coup plot was developed against the Chinese leader Mao Zedong by the supporters of Lin Biao, then vice-chairman of the Chinese Communist Party. Any attempts that may have been made at the coup ultimately failed.
 Morocco: A coup attempt was organized by General Mohamed Medbouh and Colonel M'hamed Ababou and carried out by cadets during a diplomatic function at King Hassan II's summer palace in Rabat. The King and important guests were detained, and plotters took control of Rabat's radio station to say that the king had been killed and a republic had been founded. Royalist troops regained the palace and ended the coup attempt.
Bolivia: General Hugo Banzer overthrew President Juan José Torres and established a military dictatorship.

1972
Ghana: Colonel Ignatius Kutu Acheampong led a coup to overthrow the democratically elected government of the Progress Party and its leader Kofi Abrefa Busia on 13 January.
Martial law declared in the Philippines: President Ferdinand Marcos declared martial law in a self-coup, beginning 14 years of authoritarian rule.
October Yusin (or October Restoration) in South Korea: President Park Chung-hee assumed dictatorial powers in a self-coup on 17 October.
1972 Dahomeyan coup d'état: Major Mathieu Kérékou led a coup that overthrew the Dahomeyan Presidential Council. 
Honduras: On 4 December, General Oswaldo López Arellano led the Armed Forces of Honduras to oust President Ramón Ernesto Cruz Uclés after only 18 months in power.

1973
El Tanquetazo in Chile: Lieutenant Colonel Roberto Souper launched a failed coup against President Salvador Allende.
1973 Afghan coup d'état: Former Prime Minister Mohammed Daoud Khan overthrew the King Mohammed Zahir Shah and established a Republic.
Pakistan: 59 military officers were arrested after allegedly plotting to overthrow the government of Zulfikar Ali Bhutto.
1973 Rwandan coup d'état: Army Chief of Staff Juvénal Habyarimana overthrew President Gregoire Kayibanda in a military coup.
1973 Chilean coup d'état: On 11 September, General Augusto Pinochet led a group of military officers to seize power from President Salvador Allende, and installed a junta headed by Pinochet.
1973 Uruguayan coup d'état: President Juan María Bordaberry, with the assistance of a junta of military generals, dissolved Parliament in a self-coup.
Greece: On 25 November, Army hardliners led by Brigadier Dimitrios Ioannidis overthrew the hitherto leader of the Greek junta, President Georgios Papadopoulos.
 1973 Laotian coup d'état attempt: Exiled General Thao Ma took over a Laotian airfield and led air strikes on the office and home of General Kouprasith Abhay in an attempt to stave off a communist coalition government in Laos. Royalist forces retook the airfield, and shot down and executed Thao Ma when he returned after the bombings, which had failed to kill Kouprasith.

1974
Carnation Revolution in Portugal: A coup organized by the Armed Forces Movement ended the dictatorship of Marcello Caetano.
1974 Cypriot coup d'état: Members of the Greek military overthrew President Makarios III and triggered invasion by Turkey.
 Uganda: An attempted military coup against Idi Amin failed.
Ethiopia: The Derg, a communist junta led by General Aman Andom and Mengistu Haile Mariam, enacted a coup and overthrew Haile Selassie.

1975
Comoros: Mercenary Bob Denard, on orders from Jacques Foccart, overthrew President Ahmed Abdallah.
1975 Nigerian coup d'état: A faction of junior military officers overthrew Yakubu Gowon and appointed Brigadier Murtala Muhammed as head of state.
 24 February 1975 Pyjama coup was a failed conspiracy by far-right Greek military officers, to re-establish the Greek junta. The term "pyjamas coup" was coined by then-Defense Minister Evangelos Averoff.
15 August 1975 Bangladesh coup d'état: Army officers killed Sheikh Mujibur Rahman, and Khondaker Mostaq Ahmad announced the formation of a new government with himself as leader.
3 November 1975 Bangladesh coup d'état: General Khaled Mosharraf led a military coup to overthrown Khondaker Mostaq Ahmed, who had come to power in a coup months earlier.
7 November 1975 Bangladesh coup d'état: Left wing army personnel killed General Khaled Mosharraf and paved the way for Ziaur Rahman to take power. Rahman would go on to survive as many as 21 assassination and coup attempts until his 1981 assassination.
1975 Chadian coup d'état: Members of the military overthrew and killed President François Tombalbaye and replaced him with Noël Milarew Odingar.
1975 Australian constitutional crisis (also known as "the Dismissal"): A constitutional crisis occurred in Australia. It has been referred to by some, including author John Pilger, as a "soft coup" due to allegations of involvement by British and American intelligence agencies in the removal of then-Prime Minister Gough Whitlam.

1976
Ecuador: A bloodless military coup removed Guillermo Rodríguez from power.
China: A bloodless coup overthrew the Gang of Four, which had been led by Chairman Mao Zedong's widow, Jiang Qing.
Coup in Thailand: A military coup on the evening of the 6 October 1976 massacre installed an ultra-right government with Thanin Kraivichien as prime minister.
1976 Nigerian coup d'état attempt: Military officers led by Lieutenant Colonel Buka Suka Dimka succeeded in assassinating General Murtala Muhammed, but failed to enact a coup.
1976 Argentine coup d'état: A military coup overthrew Isabel Perón and led to the National Reorganization Process.

1977
Operation Fair Play in Pakistan: Chief of Army Staff General Muhammad Zia-ul-Haq led a coup to overthrow the government of Prime Minister Zulfikar Ali Bhutto.
1977 Seychelles coup d'état: Supporters of the United Seychelles party overthrew President James Mancham and installed France-Albert René as president.
Thailand: A group of Royal Thai Army officers, led by General Prasert Thammasiri, failed to overthrow Prime Minister Thanin Kraivichien.
October 1977 Thai coup d'état: General Kriangsag Chamanan led a bloodless military coup against Prime Minister Thanin Kraivichien.

1978
Saur Revolution (also known as the April Revolution) in Afghanistan: The Soviet-backed People's Democratic Party of Afghanistan overthrew and killed President Mohammed Daoud Khan, and Nur Muhammad Taraki took power. 
1978 Somali coup d'état attempt: A group of military officials failed to overthrow President Siad Barre. Most of the plotters, including coup leader Colonel Mohamed Osman Irro, were summarily executed. However, some prominent officials, including Abdullahi Yusuf Ahmed, survived and formed the first resistance group against Barre known as the Somali Salvation Democratic Front.
 Operation Galaxia in Spain: A plot to stop the Spanish transition to democracy was planned for 17 November. However, some officers present at the planning informed their superiors, and the plan was thwarted.
Bolivia: After the annulment of a fraudulent election in which term-limited Hugo Banzer ensured the win of his surrogate, Juan Pereda, then denounced Pereda and blamed him for the rigged election, Pereda launched a coup and was sworn in as president. Pereda himself was overthrown several months later by David Padilla, who briefly served as president until new elections could be held.

1979
Iranian Revolution: Shah Mohammad Reza Pahlavi and the Pahlavi dynasty were overthrown, and Ayatollah Ruhollah Khomeini took power. 
Coup d'état of December Twelfth in South Korea: Major General Chun Doo-hwan led a coup against Choi Kyu-hah, and early the next year installed himself as president.
Bolivia: Alberto Natusch enacted a coup against the interim government of Wálter Guevara, but resigned after just sixteen days. As a face-saving measure, Natusch secured an agreement that Guevara wouldn't return as president, and Lidia Gueiler became interim president.
June 4th revolution in Ghana: Jerry John Rawlings and others led a military uprising that removed leader Fred Akuffo from power, following an unsuccessful attempt the month before.
1979 Equatorial Guinea coup d'état: Deputy defense minister Teodoro Obiang Nguema Mbasogo overthrew his uncle, Francisco Macías Nguema, and established the Supreme Military Council.
Operation Barracuda and the overthrow of the Central African Empire: A French-led coup overthrew Emperor Jean-Bédel Bokassa on 20 September, ending the Central African Empire and restoring the Central African Republic with David Dacko as president.
1979 Salvadoran coup d'état: Military officers overthrew President Carlos Humberto Romero and established the Revolutionary Government Junta of El Salvador.
Operation Storm-333: Babrak Karmal overthrows Hafizullah Amin and established a pro-Soviet, Parcham-dominated government.

1980–1989

1980
Coup d'état of May Eighteenth in South Korea: On May 17, General Chun Doo-hwan forced the Cabinet to extend martial law to the whole nation, which had previously not applied to Jeju-do. On May 18, citizens of Gwangju rose up against Chun Doo-hwan's military dictatorship and took control of the city. In the course of the uprising, citizens took up arms to defend themselves, but were ultimately crushed by the army. On May 20, 1980, Chun Doo-hwan and Roh Tae-woo ordered the National Assembly to be dissolved by deploying troops in the National Assembly.
1980 Bolivian coup d'état: General Luis García Meza enacted a violent military coup against his cousin, President Lidia Gueiler, who subsequently fled the country. The coup began the rule of the first Junta of Commanders of the Armed Forces.
1980 Turkish coup d'état: On 12 September, the National Security Council, headed by Chief of the General Staff General Kenan Evren, declared a coup d'état on the national channel. The Council then extended martial law throughout the country, abolished the Parliament and the government, suspended the Constitution, and banned all political parties and trade unions.
Liberia: A military coup led by Master Sergeant Samuel Doe overthrew the government led by President William Tolbert, ending 102 years of continuous rule by the True Whig Party.
Guinea Bissau: Prime Minister and commander of the armed forces, João Bernardo Vieira, overthrew the government.
1980 Surinamese coup d'état (also known as the Sergeants' Coup): A group of military officers, led by Dési Bouterse, overthrew the government of Prime Minister Henck Arron. The coup began a military dictatorship that lasted until 1991.
1980 Upper Voltan coup d'état: Colonel Saye Zerbo led a military coup and overthrew President Sangoulé Lamizana.
Nojeh coup plot in Iran: A plot by military officers to overthrow the newly established Islamic Republic of Iran and its government of Abolhassan Banisadr and Ruhollah Khomeini was largely thwarted by the arrest of hundreds of officers at Nojeh Air Base.

1981
1981 Spanish coup d'état attempt (also known as 23-F or the Tejerazo): Lieutenant-Colonel Antonio Tejero attempted a coup in which members of the military entered the Congress of Deputies during the vote to elect a President of the Government. The officers held the parliamentarians and ministers hostage for 18 hours, but surrendered the next morning without killing anyone.
1981 Gambian coup d'état attempt: Members of the Gambia Socialist Revolutionary Party and disaffected staff of the Gambia Field Force led a failed coup against President Dawda Jawara, who was in the United Kingdom. The attempt was quashed by the Senegalese armed forces.
Assassination of Ziaur Rahman in Bangladesh: A faction of officers of the Bangladesh Army succeeded in assassinating President Ziaur Rahman, who had survived many prior assassination attempts. The army suppressed the coup, and Vice President Abdus Sattar became acting president.
Suriname: Wilfred Hawker led an attempted coup against the government of Dési Bouterse, who had come to power in a coup the previous year. The coup failed, and Hawker was imprisoned and later executed.
1981 Central African Republic coup d'état: General André Kolingba overthrew President David Dacko, who was out of the country, in a bloodless coup.
1981 Ghanaian coup d'état: On 31 December, Flight Lieutenant Jerry Rawlings overthrew Hilla Limann and the People's National Party, and established the Provisional National Defence Council.
1981 Seychelles coup d'état attempt (also known as the Seychelles affair or Operation Angela): A South African-orchestrated coup attempt failed to overthrow the government of Prime Minister France-Albert René in Seychelles and install the previous president James Mancham to power.
Institution of martial law in Poland: General Wojciech Jaruzelski formed the Military Council of National Salvation and announced the institution of martial law in the country.

1982
1982 Bangladesh coup d'état: General Hussain Muhammad Ershad led a military coup to depose the civilian government, led by President Abdus Sattar, and install Ershad into power.
1982 Kenyan coup d'état attempt: An attempted military coup failed to overthrow the government of President Daniel arap Moi.
Rambocus coup attempt in Suriname: Surendre Rambocus and Wilfred Hawker attempted a coup against the government of Dési Bouterse. The attempt failed, and the plotters were arrested and later executed.
1982 Upper Voltan coup d'état: Colonel Gabriel Yoryan Somé led a military coup to overthrow the regime of Colonel Saye Zerbo, installing Jean-Baptiste Ouédraogo as president.

1983
1983 Upper Voltan coup d'état attempt: A few months after the Somé-led coup deposed Zerbo, several army officers decided to kill members of the Council of Popular Salvation and restore Zerbo to power. The plotters were arrested before they were able to do so.
1983 Upper Voltan coup d'état: On 3 August, Captain Blaise Compaoré deposed President Jean-Baptiste Ouédraogo and installed Thomas Sankara as president.
1983 Nigerian coup d'état: Members of the Nigerian military led a coup, ousting the democratically elected government of President Shehu Shagari. They installed Major General Muhammadu Buhari as leader of the Supreme Military Council, the country's new ruling body.
Grenada: In a military coup, Deputy Prime Minister Maurice Bishop was placed under house arrest. Bishop, who enjoyed popularity among the Grenadian population, was freed by supporters, and Bishop and some of his co-conspirators were executed. After the execution, the People's Revolutionary Army (PRA) formed a military Marxist government with General Hudson Austin as chairman. The United States invaded Grenada shortly after.

1984
1984 Cameroonian coup d'état attempt: Some members of the Presidential Guard failed to overthrow President Paul Biya.
1984 Mauritanian coup d'état: Maaouya Ould Sid'Ahmed Taya rose to power after a coup that overthrew President Mohamed Khouna Ould Haidalla.
1984 Guinean coup d'état: Colonel Lansana Conté led a coup, deposing Louis Lansana Beavogui and taking power himself.
Romania: A tentative coup d'état planned in October 1984 failed when the military unit assigned to carry out the plan was sent to harvest maize instead.
Bolivia: During an ultimately unsuccessful coup attempt, the military arrested President Hernán Siles Zuazo for ten hours.

1985
1985 Ugandan coup d'état: Brigadier Bazilio Olara-Okello and General Tito Okello led a coup against President Milton Obote. They briefly ruled the country via a military council, but after a few months of near chaos, Yoweri Museveni and the National Resistance Army took control.
1985 Nigerian coup d'état: Chief of Army Staff General Ibrahim Babangida led a military coup which replaced Major General Muhammadu Buhari, and replaced the Supreme Military Council with the Armed Forces Ruling Council.
1985 Sudanese coup d'état: Defense Minister and Armed Forces Commander-in-Chief, Field Marshal Abdel Rahman Swar al-Dahab, led a coup against the government of President Jaafar Nimeiry.

1986
Philippines: A coup attempt led by Juan Ponce Enrile and Gregorio Honasan failed when President Ferdinand Marcos learned of it and arrested the leaders. However, it was one of the events that led to the People Power Revolution, which did eventually result in Marcos' fall from power.
1986 Lesotho coup d'état: General Justin Lekhanya led a coup that overthrew the long-time rule of Prime Minister Leabua Jonathan.
1986 Philippine coup attempts: Two attempted coups failed in the Philippines.

1987
The Carapintada uprising in Argentina: Lieutenant Colonel Aldo Rico and Carapintada followers took up arms to make demands of the Argentine government. However, the public was sensitive to any military demands following decades of coups, and rallied around Alfonsin.
1987 Philippine coup attempts: Four attempted coups failed in the Philippines.
1987 Fijian coups d'état: Lieutenant Colonel Sitiveni Rabuka overthrew the government of Prime Minister Timoci Bavadra. After temporarily handing power to a council of ministers, in September that year, Rabuka seized control of the country again, deposed Queen Elizabeth II as head of state, and declared Fiji a republic.
1987 Burkinabé coup d'état: On 15 October, President Thomas Sankara was assassinated in a coup, and coup leader Captain Blaise Compaoré was installed as president.
1987 Tunisian coup d'état: Prime Minister Zine El Abidine Ben Ali overthrew President Habib Bourguiba.
Sierra Leone: On 23 March, police reported that a group of conspirators, including Vice President Francis Minah, was plotting to assassinate President Joseph Saidu Momoh and stage a coup after they raided a house in Freetown and discovered a cache of weapons, including rocket launchers. Minah and seventeen other alleged conspirators were convicted of treason and sentenced to death.

1988
SLORC coup in Burma: Following nationwide protests, the State Law and Order Restoration Council (SLORC) enacted a bloody military coup and imposed martial law.
Argentina: Aldo Rico, who had been imprisoned following a 1987 coup attempt, escaped prison and began a new attempt to overthrow President Raúl Alfonsín. Rico surrendered after a brief combat with the Argentinian army.
Argentina: Colonel Mohamed Alí Seineldín, backed by the Carapintadas, launched a coup attempt against President Alfonsin, but he and the other conspirators were jailed.
June 1988 Haitian coup d'état: Henri Namphy overthrew President Leslie Manigat and declared himself president.
September 1988 Haitian coup d'état: Prosper Avril overthrew President Namphy, who had come to power in a coup only months earlier.
Panama: In March, a coup was attempted against Manuel Noriega, but was suppressed.
1988 Maldives coup d'état attempt: A group of Maldivians, assisted by mercenaries, gained control of the capital and major government buildings, but the coup ultimately failed after intervention by Indian armed forces.

1989
1989 Philippine coup d'état attempt: Members of the Armed Forces of the Philippines belonging to the Reform the Armed Forces Movement (RAM) and soldiers loyal to former President Ferdinand Marcos nearly seized the presidential palace, but were defeated.
1989 Burkinabé coup d'état attempt: A coup was allegedly attempted by Baptiste Boukary Lingani, Henri Zongo, and others against President Blaise Compaoré. After the plot was discovered, alleged conspirators were arrested and summarily executed.
Ethiopia: On 16 May, while President Mengistu Haile Mariam was out of the country for a four-day state visit to East Germany, senior military officials attempted a coup and the Minister of Defense, Haile Giyorgis Habte Mariam, was killed. Mengistu quickly returned, and nine generals, including the air force commander and the army chief of staff, died as the coup was crushed.
1989 Paraguayan coup d'état (also known as La Noche de la Candelaria): General Andrés Rodríguez led a bloody coup against the regime of long-time leader Alfredo Stroessner.
1989 Sudanese coup d'état: Omar al-Bashir led a military coup on 30 June against the democratically elected government of Prime Minister Sadiq al-Mahdi and President Ahmed al-Mirghani.
1989 Panamanian coup d'état attempt: Major Moisés Giroldi led a failed coup attempt, supported by a group of officers who had returned from a United Nations peacekeeping mission in Namibia. Although the plotters succeeded in capturing Panamanian dictator Manuel Noriega, the coup was quickly suppressed. Giroldi and nine others were executed, and another participant in the coup attempt died in prison after being tortured.

1990–1999

1990
1990 Nigerian coup d'état attempt: Major Gideon Orkar attempted to overthrow the government of General Ibrahim Babangida. Though successful in seizing military posts, a radio station, and the presidential residence, Orkar and others involved in the coup were captured by government troops, convicted of treason, and later executed.
1990 Afghan coup d'état attempt: On 6 March, General Shahnawaz Tanai attempted to overthrow President Mohammad Najibullah of the Republic of Afghanistan. The coup attempt failed and Tanai was forced to flee to Pakistan.
Jamaat al Muslimeen coup attempt in Trinidad and Tobago: Jamaat al Muslimeen, a radical Islamist group, held hostages (including Prime Minister A. N. R. Robinson and other government officials) at the Red House and at the headquarters of the state-owned national television broadcaster, Trinidad and Tobago Television (TTT). On 1 August, the insurgents surrendered.
Argentina: Mohamed Alí Seineldín and other Carapintadas made a second attempt at overthrowing the Argentine government, now led by President Carlos Menem. The coup failed, and Seineldín was sentenced to life imprisonment, which he served until his 2003 pardon.
1990 Chadian coup d'état: The forces of the Patriotic Salvation Movement (MPS), a Libyan–backed rebel group under the leadership of General Idriss Déby, entered the Chadian capital N'Djamena unopposed. After three months of provisional government, the MPS approved a national charter on February 28, 1991, with Déby as president.
1990 Surinamese coup d'état (also known as the Telephone Coup): Acting commander-in-chief of the Suriname National Army (SNL), Police Chief Ivan Graanoogst, dismissed President Ramsewak Shankar by telephone on 24 December. On 27 December, the government was dismissed, the National Assembly was dissolved, and Johan Kraag was appointed as president on 29 December. On 31 December, Dési Bouterse was reappointed as commander-in-chief of the SNL.

1991
1991 Soviet coup d'état attempt (also known as the August Coup): Communist leaders of the Soviet Union failed to take control of the country from Mikhail Gorbachev, who was Soviet President and General Secretary of the party.
1991 Haitian coup d'état: The Armed Forces of Haiti deposed President Jean-Bertrand Aristide. Superior Court justice Joseph Nérette was installed as provisional president.
1991 Thai coup d'état: The National Peace Keeping Council, a military junta, overthrew the elected civilian government of Chatichai Choonhavan in 1991.
1991–92 Georgian coup d'état (also known as the Tbilisi War or the Putsch of 1991–92): A military coup removed President Zviad Gamsakhurdia from office.
1991 Malian coup d'état: A military coup overthrew Moussa Traoré, who had been dictator for over two decades.
Somalia: Guerrilla forces, including the Somali Salvation Democratic Front in the northeast, the Somali National Movement in the northwest, and the United Somali Congress in the south, performed a successful coup against the Siad Barre government. Mohamed Farah Aideed, the general most responsible for the coup, declared himself the ruling president.

1992
1992 Algerian coup d'état: A military coup in Algeria canceled elections and forced President Chadli Bendjedid to resign.
1992 Peruvian coup d'état: In a self-coup on 5 April, President Alberto Fujimori dissolved the Peruvian congress and judiciary and assumed full legislative and judicial powers.
Peru: On 13 November, General Jaime Salinas Sedó led a group of military officers in attempting to overthrow President Fujimori, but was unsuccessful.
1992 Venezuelan coup d'état attempts: There were two unsuccessful coup attempts against Carlos Andrés Pérez, in February and November; the first led by Hugo Chávez.
1992 Sierra Leonean coup d'état: A group of young military officers, led by Captain Valentine Strasser, took control of the government on 29 April. They deposed President Joseph Saidu Momoh and Strasser took control of the government.

1993
1993 Russian constitutional crisis (also known as the 1993 October Coup, Black October, the Shooting of the White House or Ukase 1400): President Boris Yeltsin successfully launched a self-coup, illegally dissolving the Russian parliament.
1993 Guatemalan constitutional crisis: President Jorge Serrano Elías unsuccessfully launched a self-coup, illegally suspending the constitution and dissolving Congress and the Supreme Court. Facing protests and international pressure, Serrano resigned the presidency and fled the country. He was briefly replaced by Vice President Gustavo Adolfo Espina Salguero, but after Espina was found by the Supreme Court to have been involved in the coup, Congress replaced him with Ramiro de León Carpio.
1993 Azerbaijani coup d'état: On 1 September, militia led by military commander Surat Huseynov overthrew President Abulfaz Elchibey and brought Heydar Aliyev to power.

1994
1994 Bophuthatswana crisis: Lucas Mangope was overthrown by the South African Defence Force (SADF).
1994 Gambian coup d'état: A group of soldiers led by Lieutenant Yahya Jammeh seized power in a bloodless coup on 22 July, ousting Dawda Jawara, who had been President of the Gambia since its independence in 1970.

1995
1995 Azerbaijani coup d'état attempt (also known as the Turkish coup in Baku): members of the Azerbaijani military, led by Colonel Rovshan Javado, aimed to take control of the country from president Heydar Aliyev and reinstall former president Abulfaz Elchibey. The coup was foiled when the Turkish President Süleyman Demirel became aware of elements in Turkey supporting the plot, and called Aliyev to warn him. On 17 March, units of the Azerbaijani Armed Forces surrounded the insurgents' camp and assaulted it, killing Colonel Javadov.
1995 Qatari coup d'état: Crown Prince Hamad bin Khalifa Al Thani who, with the support of the ruling Al Thani family, took control of the country while his father, Emir Khalifa bin Hamad Al Thani, was away.

1996
1996 Qatari coup d'état attempt: Many members of the Al Thani family who were still allies of Khalifa bin Hamad Al Thani, who had been deposed in a coup the prior year, organized a coup to overthrow Hamad bin Khalifa Al Thani. However, the coup was discovered and thwarted.
1996 Burundian coup d'état: In the midst of the Burundi Civil War, former president Pierre Buyoya deposed President Sylvestre Ntibantunganya on 25 July.
1996 Iraqi coup d'état attempt: A coup attempt against President Saddam Hussein failed.

1997
1997 Turkish military memorandum (also known as the Post-modern coup): Military decisions issued in a National Security Council meeting on 28 February have been described as a coup. Although the parliament was not dissolved, the military pressure resulted in the resignation of Prime Minister Necmettin Erbakan.
1997 Cambodian coup d'état: Co-premier Hun Sen ousted the other co-premier, Norodom Ranariddh.

1998
May 1998 riots of Indonesia: Mass violence, demonstrations, and civil unrest throughout Indonesia, triggered by economic problems including food shortages and mass unemployment, eventually led to the resignation of President Suharto and the fall of the New Order.

1999
1999 Pakistani coup d'état: In a bloodless coup, military staff under Chairman of the Joint Chiefs of Staff Committee General Pervez Musharraf seized control of the civilian government of Prime Minister Nawaz Sharif on 12 October. Musharraf declared a state of emergency and imposed martial law. Sharif was arrested and later exiled.
1999 Ivorian coup d'état: A group of soldiers led by Tuo Fozié rebelled on 23 December, overthrowing President Henri Konan Bédié.

2000–2009

2000
2000 Ecuadorean coup d'état: President Jamil Mahuad was deposed and replaced by Vice President Gustavo Noboa.
2000 Fijian coup d'état: A civilian coup by hardline i-Taukei nationalists against the elected government of Prime Minister Mahendra Chaudhry occurred on 19 May. President Kamisese Mara attempted to assert executive authority on 27 May, but gave his resignation, possibly forced, on 29 May. An interim government headed by Commodore Frank Bainimarama was set up, and handed power over to an interim administration headed by Ratu Josefa Iloilo, as president, on 13 July.
2000 Solomon Islands coup d'état: Rebel Malaita Eagle Forces led a coup against Prime Minister Bartholomew Ulufa'alu. Ulufa'alua was forced to resign, and was replaced by Manasseh Sogavare.

2001 

 2001 Burundian coup d'état attempt: A group of junior army officers attempted a coup against President Pierre Buyoya, who was out of the country. The conspirators briefly occupied a state-run radio station before being removed by forces loyal to the president.
 2001 Central African Republic coup d'état attempt: Commandos of the Central African Armed Forces attempted to overthrow President Ange-Félix Patassé. The coup failed, though violence continued in the capital for several days after.

2002
Ivory Coast (also known as Côte d'Ivoire): A coup may have been attempted on 19 September, the first night of the First Ivorian Civil War. Former president Robert Guéï was killed; state government claimed it had happened as he attempted to lead a coup, but it was widely claimed that Guéï and fifteen others had been murdered in his home and his body moved.
2002 Venezuelan coup d'état attempt: President Hugo Chávez was ousted from office for 47 hours before being restored to power with the help of popular support (mostly labor unions) and members of the military.

2003
2003 Central African Republic coup d'état: President Ange-Félix Patassé was overthrown while out of the country, when the forces of General François Bozizé took over the airport and presidential palace.
2003 Mauritanian coup d'état attempt: Major Saleh Ould Hanenna led a rebel section of the Army to attempt a coup against President Maaouya Ould Sid'Ahmed Taya. The soldiers were defeated by troops loyal to the president.
2003 São Tomé and Príncipe coup d'état attempt: Major Fernando Pereira launched a coup against the government of President Fradique de Menezes. After a week with the Army in power, conspirators relinquished control following negotiations with the government.
Oakwood mutiny in the Philippines: A group of military defectors who came to be known as the Magdalo (mutineers) forcibly occupied the Oakwood Premier apartments and demanded the resignation of President Gloria Macapagal Arroyo and other officials. They relinquished the apartments about 20 hours later after negotiations.
2003 Guinea-Bissau coup d'état: General Veríssimo Correia Seabra led a bloodless military coup against President Kumba Ialá.
2003 Burkinabé coup d'état attempt: A plot to overthrow President Blaise Compaoré was discovered and thwarted.
Sledgehammer (coup plan) an alleged Turkish secularist military coup plan dating back to 2003, in response to the Justice and Development Party (AKP) gaining office.

2004
2004 Haitian coup d'état: President Jean-Bertrand Aristide was ousted during his second term, and an interim government led by Prime Minister Gérard Latortue and President Boniface Alexandre was installed.
2004 Chadian coup d'état attempt: A coup attempt against President Idriss Déby was suppressed after a brief exchange of fire.
2004 Equatorial Guinea coup d'état attempt (also known as the Wonga Coup): A plot was developed to replace President Teodoro Obiang Nguema Mbasogo with exiled opposition politician, Severo Moto Nsá. However, the mercenaries who had been hired by mostly British financiers were arrested in Zimbabwe before they could carry out the plot.
Sarıkız, Ayışığı, Yakamoz and Eldiven were the names of alleged Turkish military coup plans in 2004.

2005
 Peru coup attempt next to civil uprising known as the Andahuaylazo, directed by Antauro Humala in the city of Andahuaylas
 Ecuador civil coup d'état of 2005. It resulted in the premature end of President Lucio Edwin Gutiérrez Borbúa's term
 Coup in Togo legalized by parliamentary vote but unrecognized by international community.
 King Gyanendra of Nepal overthrows the government in a self-coup, making him the head of government. The government is reestablished 24 April 2006 after a massive democracy movement.
A military coup in Mauritania overthrows President Maaouya Ould Sid'Ahmed Taya. A new government is set up by a group of military officers headed by Ely Ould Mohamed Vall. The group formed the Military Council for Justice and Democracy to act as the governing council of the country.

2006

The Armed Forces of the Philippines allegedly attempted a military coup in the Philippines targeting President Gloria Macapagal Arroyo, which led to a state of emergency in the country.
The United Front for Democratic Change allegedly attempts to instigate a military coup in Chad to overthrow President Idriss Déby.
The Royal Thai Army orchestrates a coup in Thailand that overthrows Prime Minister Thaksin Shinawatra while he is out of the country.
The Malagasy Popular Armed Forces allegedly attempt a military coup in Madagascar against President Marc Ravalomanana.
The military of Fiji overthrows President Josefa Iloilo and Prime Minister Laisenia Qarase in a bloodless coup.
The military of Côte d'Ivoire claims to foil a coup attempt targeting President Laurent Gbagbo.
A military attempted coup in Madagascar on 18 November 2006 led by General Andrianafidisoa against  President Marc Ravalomanana

2007
An alleged coup attempt by General Vang Pao and others in the United States to overthrow the Laotian government is foiled.
Philippines rebel forces led by opposition politician Sen. Antonio Trillanes from the Magdalo Group, storm the Peninsula hotel in an attempted coup.

2008
East Timorese President José Ramos-Horta is shot and injured in what Prime Minister Xanana Gusmão describes as an attempted coup.
A military coup in Mauritania involving the seizure of the President Sidi Ould Cheikh Abdallahi, Prime Minister Yahya Ould Ahmed El Waghef, and Interior Minister after the sacking of several military officials and a political crisis in which 48 MPs walked off the job and a vote of no confidence in cabinet.
A military coup occurs in Guinea after the death of President Lansana Conté.

2009
Coup in Madagascar: the army seized one of the presidential palaces on 16 March 2009, at which president Marc Ravalomanana was not present. The proposal offered by the president for a referendum to solve the crisis was rejected. On 17 March 2009, Marc Ravalomanana resigned under pressure from the military.
 In Honduras, the army seized one of the presidential palaces on 28 June 2009, kidnapped president Manuel Zelaya Rosales due to his endeavor for an unconstitutional reelection and extradited him from the country. The 23-nation Rio Group & the United Nations General Assembly condemned the coup d'état.
 On 24 April 2009, the Ethiopian government claimed, through the Ethiopian News Agency, that it had foiled a coup attempt led by members of Ginbot 7 to overthrow the government. Ginbot 7 described the allegation that it had attempted a coup as a "baseless accusation" that fitted a pattern of distraction and scapegoating by the government.

2010–2019

2010
 On 18 February a Nigerien coup by Salou Djibo against President Mamadou Tandja.

2011
 2011 Bangladesh coup d'état attempt
 2011 Egyptian revolution – The Egyptian Supreme Council of the Armed Forces takes power after two weeks of mass protests, forcing long-time President Hosni Mubarak to step down and relinquish power to the council.

2012

 On 21 March successful Malian Coup by Malian soldiers led by Captain Amadou Sanogo against President Amadou Toumani Touré.
 On 12 April a Guinea-Bissau Coup by Army Vice Chief of Staff General Mamadu Ture Kuruma against Acting President Raimundo Pereira and ex-Prime Minister and presidential candidate Carlos Gomes Júnior.
 On 30 April – 1 May an attempt Malian counter-coup d'état by Amadou Toumani Touré's loyalists against Acting President Dioncounda Traoré and acting prime minister Cheick Modibo Diarra.

2013
 The Eritrean opposition claimed that there was an attempt coup on 21 January 2013.
 On 4 March an attempt coup in Benin led by Col. Pamphile Zomahoun against President Boni Yayi.
 On 24 March 2013 Séléka rebels overthrew government of the Central African Republic.
 On 17 April 2013 an attempt Libyan coup against Prime Minister Ali Zeidan by Muammar Gaddafi loyalists.
 On 20 April 2013 an attempt coup in the Comoros against President Ikililou Dhoinine. 
 A failed Coup in Chad on 1 May 2013 against President Idriss Déby.
On 3 July a military coup in Egypt led by General Abdul Fatah al-Sisi ousted president Mohamed Morsi.
 On 10 October 2013 a second attempt Libyan coup led by Abdel Moneim Aboul Fotouh against Prime Minister Ali Zeidan.

2014
 Two attempted Libyan coups one on 14 February 2014 and second in May 2014 by Libyan Republican Alliance led by Maj. Gen. Khalifa Haftar against Prime Minister Ali Zeidan in first coup and Prime Minister Abdullah al-Thani in second coup.  
 An attempted coup in Lesotho against Prime Minister Tom Thabane by Lieutenant General Kennedy Tlai Kamoli and Deputy Prime Minister Mothetjoa Metsing.
2014 Thai coup d'état: The Royal Thai Armed Forces led by General Prayut Chan-o-cha overthrew the Yingluck cabinet, establishing a military junta on 22 May 2014.
 On 30 December 2014 an attempted Gambian Coup was launched  against President Yahya Jammeh by former head of the presidential guards Lamin Sanneh.

2015
 In 13–15 May the unsuccessful 2015 Burundi Coup by General Godefroid Niyombare against President Pierre Nkurunziza.
 On 17 September an attempted coup in Burkina Faso against President Michel Kafando by General Gilbert Diendéré.
 26 September – 3 October 2015: Failed attempt by Haroun Gaye and Eugene Ngaïkosset to overthrow president of the Central African Republic Catherine Samba-Panza.

2016
2016 Turkish coup d'état attempt: On 15–16 July 2016 an attempted coup failed against President Recep Tayyip Erdoğan.
2016 Burkinabé coup d'état attempt: On 8 October 2016 Blaise Compaore loyalists and former presidential guards failed to overthrow President Roch Marc Christian Kaboré.
2016 Libyan coup d'état attempt: On 14 October 2016 an attempted coup against prime minister-designate Fayez al-Sarraj led by Khalifa al-Ghawil.
Montenegrin coup plot: On 16 October 2016 a Montenegrin attempted coup by Main Intelligence Directorate agents and pro-Russian organisations from Serbia and Montenegro against the government of Milo Đukanović on the day of the parliamentary election.

2017
 A coup d'état plot was foiled in Austria in April. The leader Monika Unger and others were arrested after they tried to organise an army-led coup. 
 On 21 June 2017, Prince Mohammed bin Salman ousted and succeeded Saudi Crown Prince and de facto leader Muhammad bin Nayef in what was described as a "palace coup".
2017 Zimbabwean coup d'état: Harare, Zimbabwe. In the early hours of 15 November 2017, an army spokesman announced the military takeover of government. This was after the army had seized control of the state run television broadcasting station. During the night before they had stormed the president's private residence and placed the head of state, President Robert Gabriel Mugabe under house arrest. The military police also captured and detained some cabinet ministers whom they labelled criminals around the president. It would succeed with the resignation of Mugabe on 21 November 2017.
 In December an attempted coup against the government in Equatorial Guinea.

2019
2019 Gabonese coup d'état attempt: On 7 January 2019, members of the Armed Forces of Gabon announced a coup, claiming to have ousted President Ali Bongo.  Gabon's government later declared that it had reasserted control.  
2019 Sudanese coup d'état: On 11 April 2019, the Sudanese Army overthrew Sudanese President Omar al-Bashir after popular protests.
2019 Amhara Region coup d'état attempt: On 22 June 2019,  Factions of the security forces of Amhara Region, Ethiopia, attempted a coup against the regional government after a series of assassinations.

2020–present

2020
 On 7 March, the Saudi Arabian government arrested Princes Ahmed bin Abdulaziz, Muhammad bin Nayef, Nayef bin Ahmed, Nawwaf bin Nayef and Muhammad bin Saad for allegedly planning a coup attempt.
 2020 Malian coup d'état: On 18 August, Mutinying soldiers within the Malian Army attacked the capital and the nearby army base. The soldiers arrested both the democratically elected President Ibrahim Boubacar Keïta and Prime Minister Boubou Cissé after months of anti-government protests. President Keïta resigns and dissolved both the government and parliament just after midnight. A military junta was soon after installed under Colonel Assimi Goita.
 On 20 October, a senior army officer in Sudan announced that some retired members of the Popular Defence Forces and officers under leader Brigadier General Mohammed Ibrahim Abdul-Jalil had foiled a coup plot. The Sudanese government has not confirmed this claim.
 2020–21 Central African Republic coup d'état attempt: In December 2020 major rebel groups in Central African Republic led by former president François Bozizé formed Coalition of Patriots for Change trying to overthrow the government. Rebel groups attacked Bangui on 13 January but were repulsed by government forces.

2021
2021 United States Capitol attack: President Donald Trump refused to concede to Joe Biden after losing the 2020 United States presidential election, leading, for the first time in at least 220 years, to a failure of the peaceful transition of power. Supporters of the president stormed the Capitol building during the counting of electoral votes, and temporarily halted the process. Early the next morning the counting resumed and Joe Biden was confirmed as president, being inaugurated two weeks later.
As early as January 2021, several European security officials described the events as an attempted coup. Federal Judge David O Carter ruled that Trump's efforts to overturn the election were a "coup in search of a legal theory". In a televised hearing on June 9, 2022, Congressman Bennie Thompson, Chair of the United States House Select Committee on the January 6 Attack, described Trump's campaign to overturn the 2021 presidential election as an attempted coup. On January 4, 2021, Steve Bannon stated on The War Room podcast, while discussing the planning for the upcoming events and speech by Trump on January 6 at The Ellipse, said: "Live from our nation's capital, you're in the field headquarters of one of the small divisions of the bloodless coup."
2021 Myanmar coup d'état: On 1 February, State Counsellor Aung San Suu Kyi and President Win Myint were arrested by the military of Myanmar. The military announced that power had been handed to Min Aung Hlaing, the commander-in-chief of the armed forces. The military announced on state-run TV that they would be in control of the country for one year.
2021 Armenian coup d'état attempt: On 25 February, the Armenian Armed Forces chief of staff Onik Gasparyan called on Prime minister of Armenia Nikol Pashinyan to resign due to his handling of the 2020 Nagorno-Karabakh war and after the dismissal of the first deputy-head of army.
2021 Nigerien coup d'état attempt: On 31 March, elements within the military attempted a coup. After gunfire at the presidential palace, Presidential Guard fended off the attack and many of its alleged perpetrators were later detained.
2021 arrests in Jordan: On 3 April, Jordanian authorities arrested top officials and members of the royal family, including former Crown Prince Hamzah bin Hussein, for involvement in an attempted coup.
2021 Malian coup d'état: On 24 May, the president, prime minister, and defense minister of Mali were detained by the military.
2021 Guinean coup d'état: On 5 September, military forces of Guinea lead by Mamady Doumbouya, invaded the presidential palace and arrested the president.
September 2021 Sudanese coup d'état attempt: On 21 September, officials and troops loyal to ousted leader Omar al-Bashir attempted a coup against the Sovereignty Council of Sudan.
 October–November 2021 Sudanese coup d'état: On 25 October, the military forces of Sudan launched a successful coup against the government. The prime minister Abdalla Hamdok was arrested, the government was dissolved and a state of emergency was declared by Abdel Fattah al-Burhan. Hamdok was later reinstated in November but resigned in 2022 amid continuing protests.

2022 

 January 2022 Burkina Faso coup d'état: In late January, the Burkinabé military staged a coup against Roch Marc Christian Kaboré.
 2022 Guinea-Bissau coup d'état attempt: A coup d'état was attempted in Guinea-Bissau on 1 February 2022. President Umaro Sissoco Embalo said that "many" members of the security forces had been killed in a "failed attack against democracy".
2022 Ukrainian coup d'état attempt: Russian intelligence agency FSB and recruited ATO veterans were set to take control of various Ukrainian cities, install pro-Russian leaders in them and transfer those cities to the Russian army during the 2022 Russian invasion of Ukraine. However, as plans for coup were discovered by Ukrainian authorities, people who were set to participate in it were detained by SBU.
September 2022 Burkina Faso coup d'état
2022 São Tomé and Príncipe coup d'état attempt
2022 German coup d'état plot
2022 Peruvian self-coup d'état attempt

2023
 2023 Brazilian Congress attack: Supporters of former president Jair Bolsonaro storm the National Congress, Supreme Federal Court and Planalto Palace in Brasília, in an effort to overturn the result of the 2022 Brazilian general election and claim for a military coup against President Luiz Inácio Lula da Silva.
 2023 Moldovan attempted coup d'état: Plans were unveiled by the president of Moldova, Maia Sandu, that showed Russian efforts to overthrow the Moldovan government.

See also

 Attempts to overturn the 2020 United States presidential election
 List of coups and coup attempts by country
 List of coups and coup attempts since 2010
 List of invasions
 List of revolutions and rebellions – chronological listing
 Soft coup

References

External links
Scholarly databases and lists of coups include the following:
Jonathan Powell and Clayton Thyne, “Coups in the World, 1950-Present” .  
Regular updates from Jonathan Powell and Clayton Thyne to their database.
Monty G. Marshall and Donna Ramsey Marshall, “Coups d'État, 1946-2015”. 
 John J. Chin, David B. Carter & Joseph G. Wright. Colpus Dataset on all military and non-military coup attempts in the world since 1946. 
 Cline Center Coup D’état Project Dataset. 
 Bjørnskov-Rode regime data.

History-related lists
Lists of military conflicts
Politics-related lists
Attempted coups d'état